= Royal Academy Exhibition of 1870 =

1870 art exhibition in London

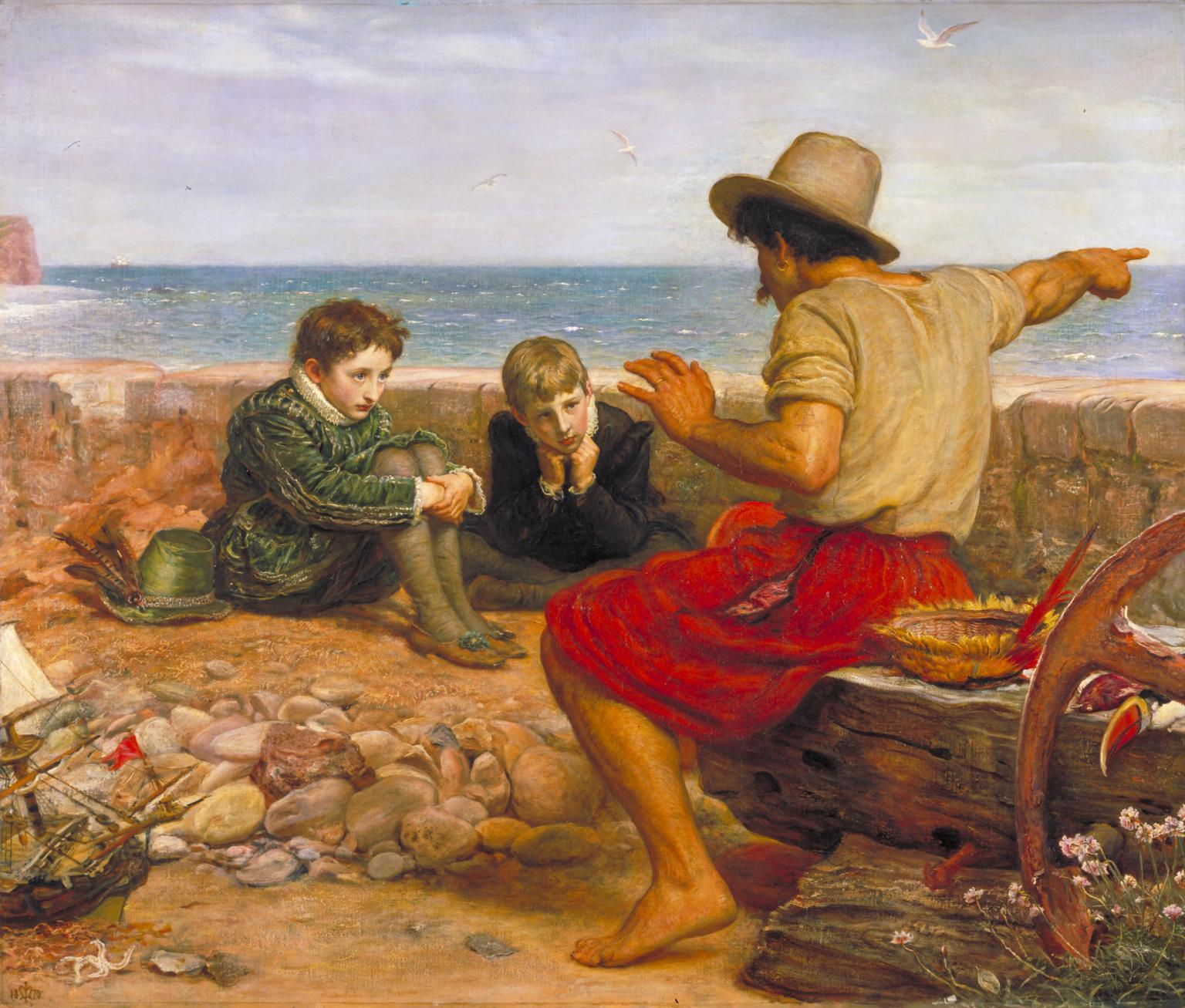
The Boyhood of Raleigh by John Everett Millais

The Royal Academy Exhibition of 1870 was the 102nd annual Summer Exhibition of the Royal Academy of Arts. It was held from 2 May to 30 July 1870 at Burlington House in Piccadilly, the second time it took place there following a move from the National Gallery the previous year.

The annual dinner that opened the exhibition was presided over by the President of the Royal Academy Francis Grant and ws attended by both the Prime Minister William Gladstone and the Princes of Wales. This was also the first year that a winter exhibition was held to sell classic paintings, leading to feeds that contemporary art might by overshadowed by major works of the precious century such as those produced by Joshua Reynolds.

John Everett Millais was notable amongst the artists submitting work. His The Boyhood of Raleigh, featured a patriotic scene of the Tudor era adventurer Sir Walter Raleigh in childhood. Millais also showed off a scene of Medieval chivalry The Knight Errant, his only attempt to feature a nude women, with reviews focusing on his naturalistic style compared to equivalent French works. The celebrated animal painter Edwin Landseer displayed a portrait of the racehorse Voltigeur. Edward Matthew Ward's Judge Jeffreys and Richard Baxter depicted a scene from the reign of James II.

The Irish artist Daniel Maclise died shortly before the exhibition opened and his history painting The Earls of Desmond and Ormond was exhibited posthumously. The French artist Jean-Léon Gérôme displayed his painting Jerusalem which had already appeared at the Salon of 1868 in Paris. After viewing it at the Academy the writer Thomas Hardy described it as "a fine conception". Gérôme also displayed The Execution of Marshal Ney, depicting a scene from the Napoleonic Wars. James McNeill Whistler submitted The Balcony but this made less of an impact than he had hoped and gained mixed reviews.

The Winter Exhibition was held from 3 January to 12 March 1870. Amongst the paintings on display were significant retrospectives featuring the works of Charles Robert Leslie and Clarkson Stanfield.

== Gallery ==
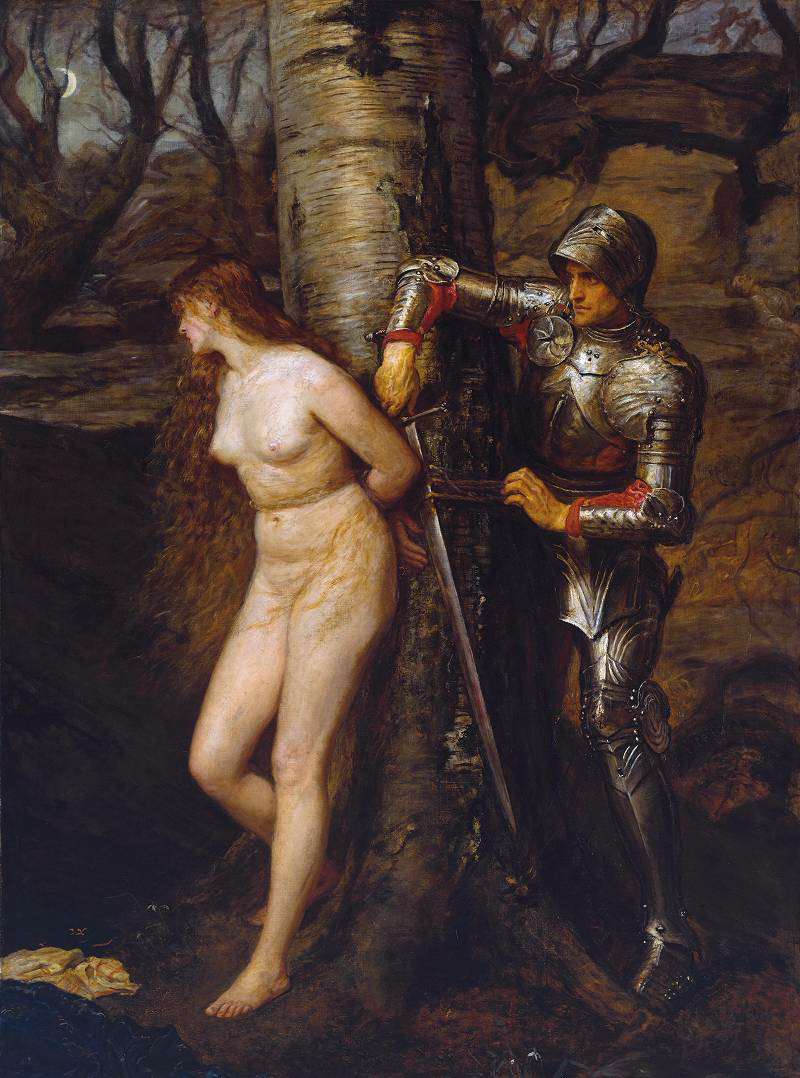
The Knight Errant by John Everett Millais

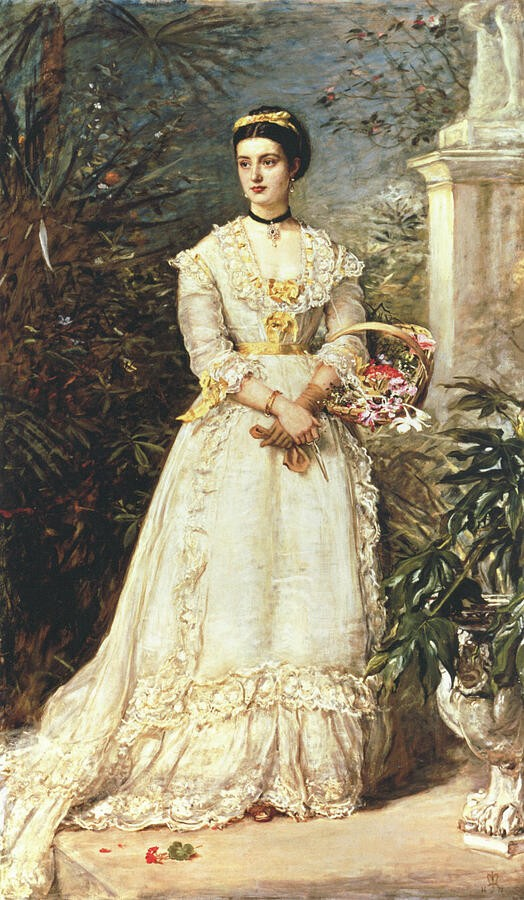
Portrait of the Marchioness of Huntly by John Everett Millais

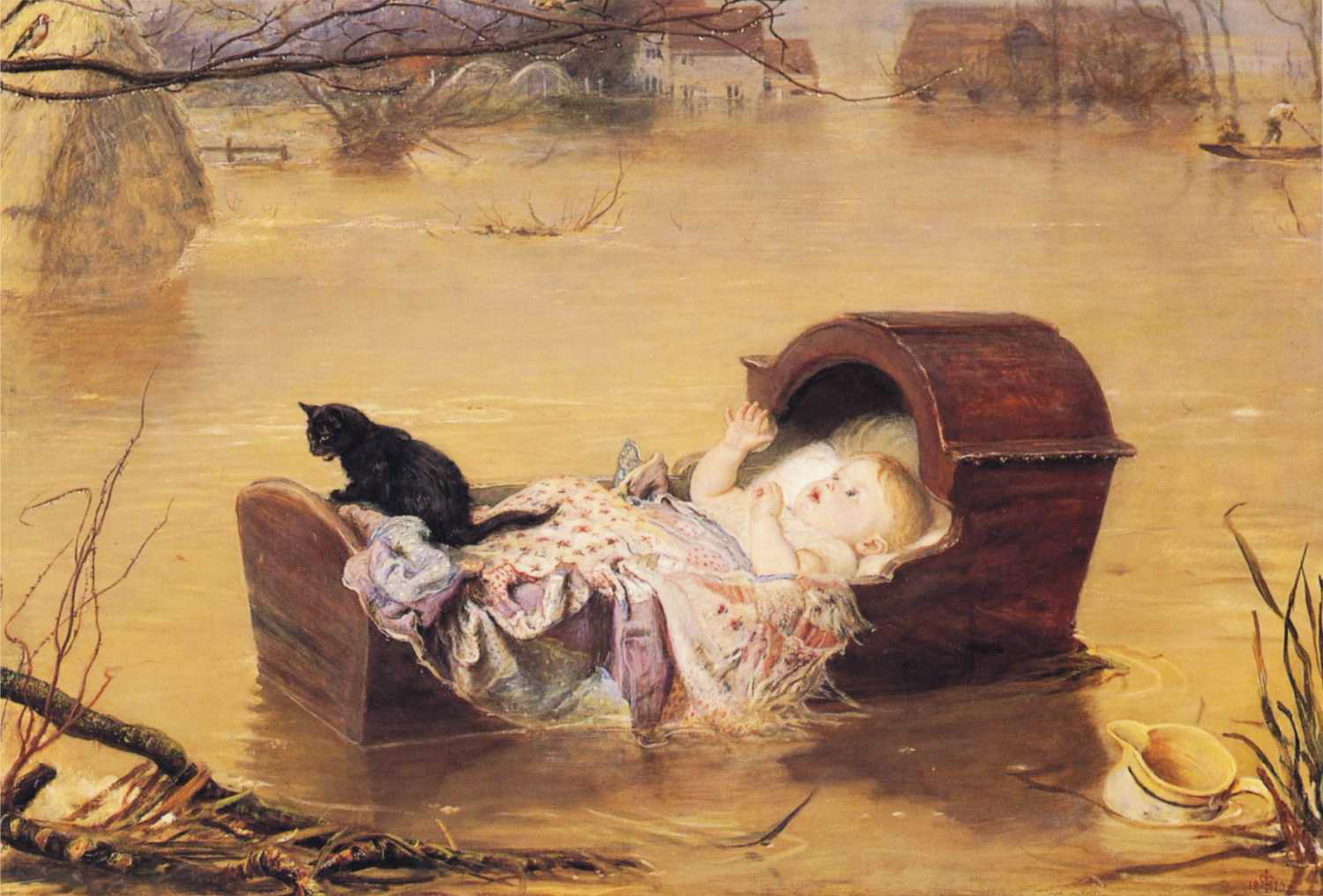
A Flood by John Everett Millais

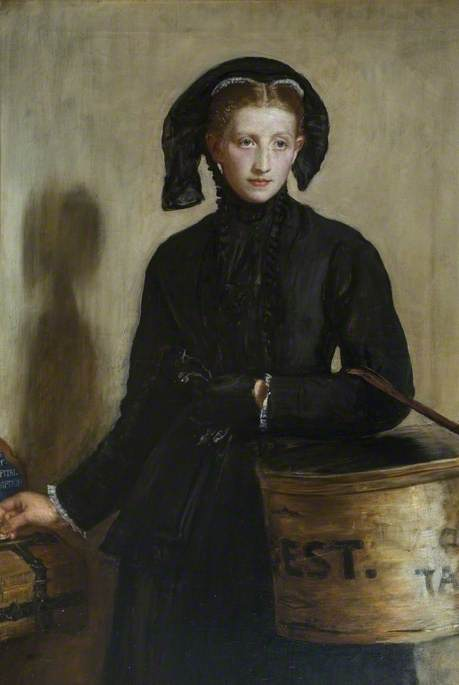
A Widow's Mite by John Everett Millais

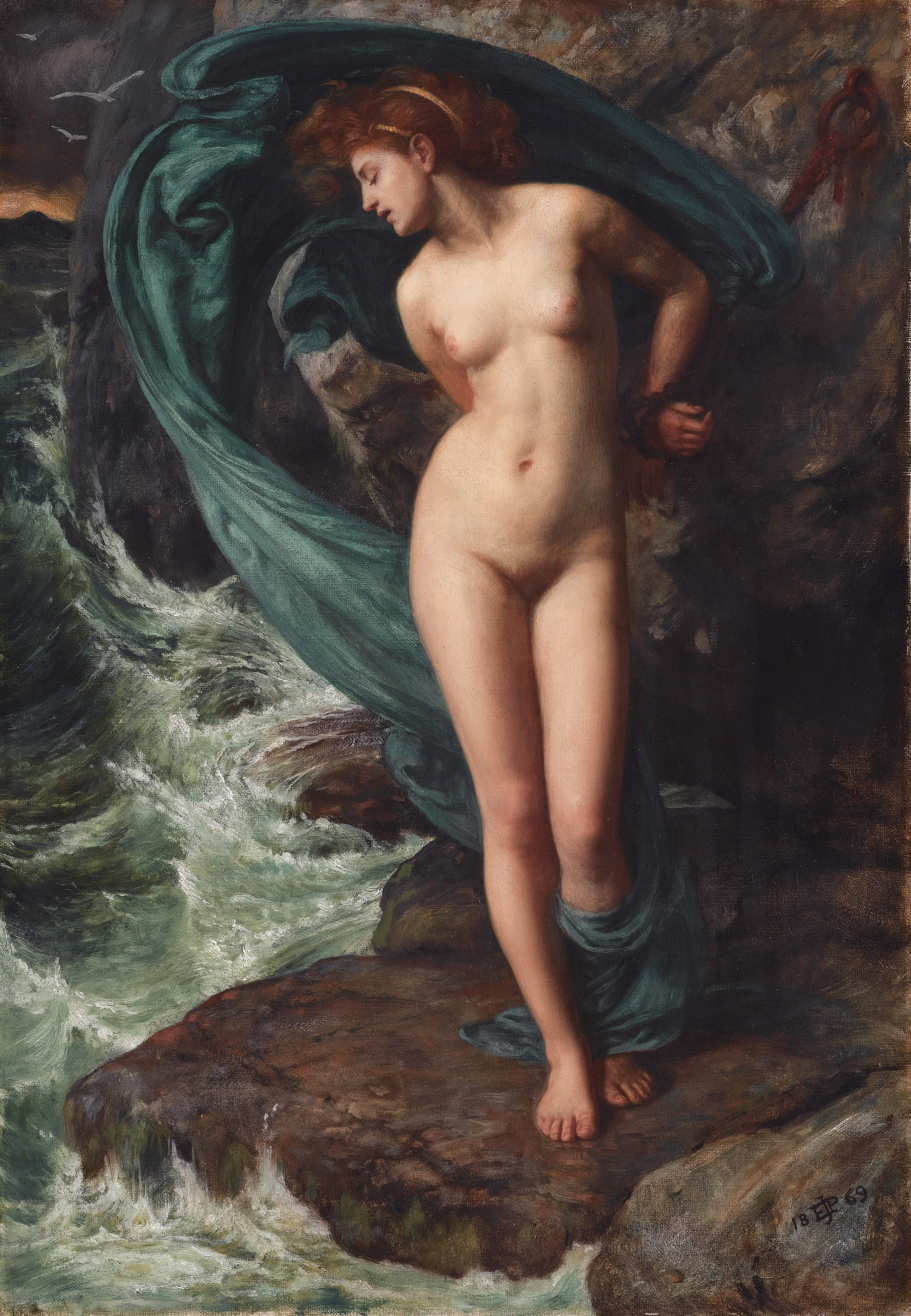
Andromeda by Edward Poynter

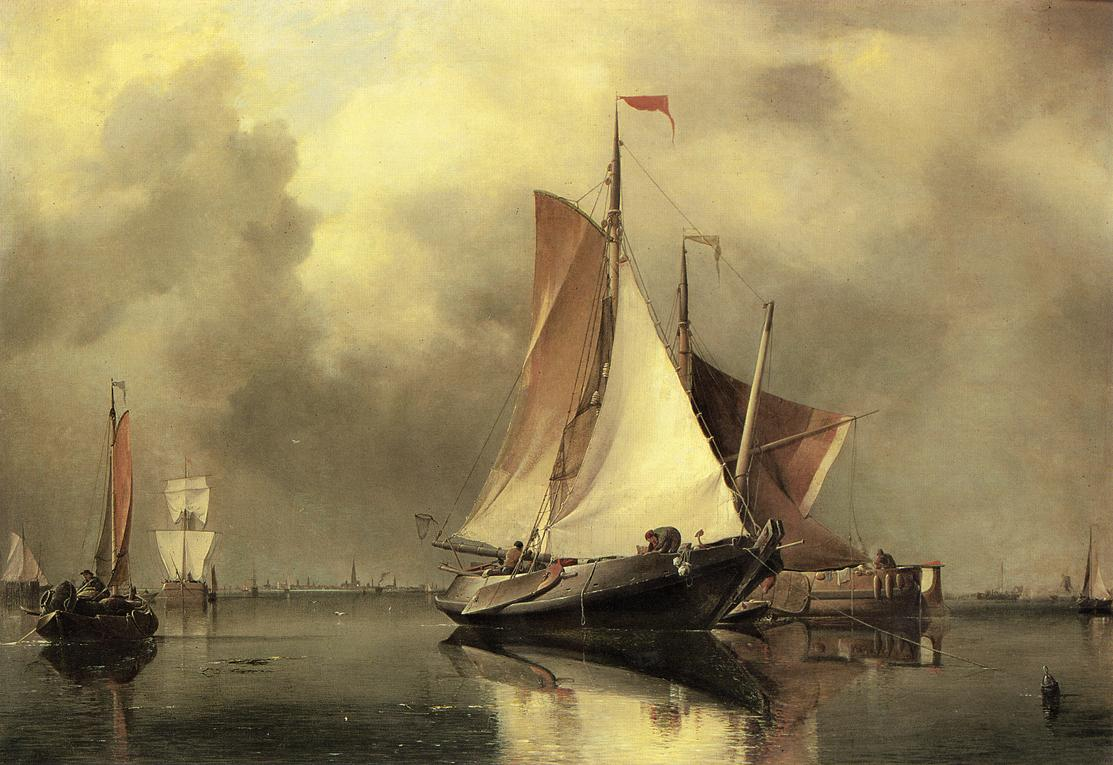
A Calm Day on the Scheldt by Edward William Cooke

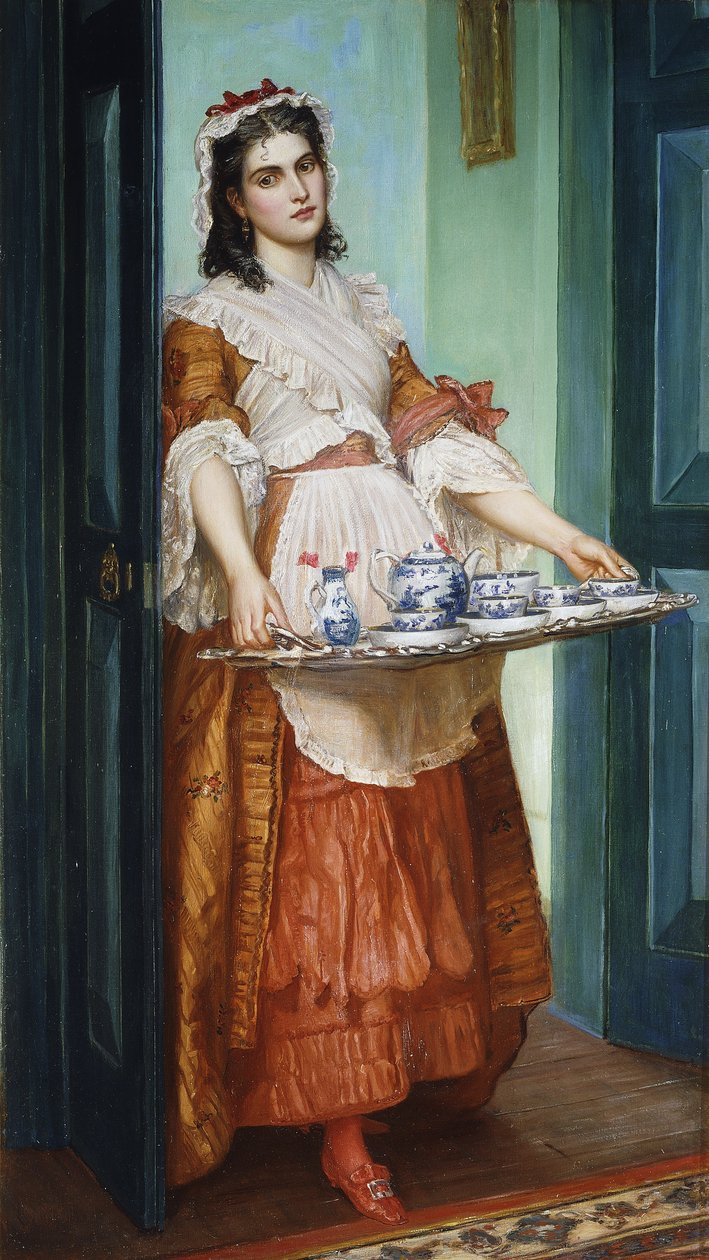
The Dish of Tea by Valentine Cameron Prinsep

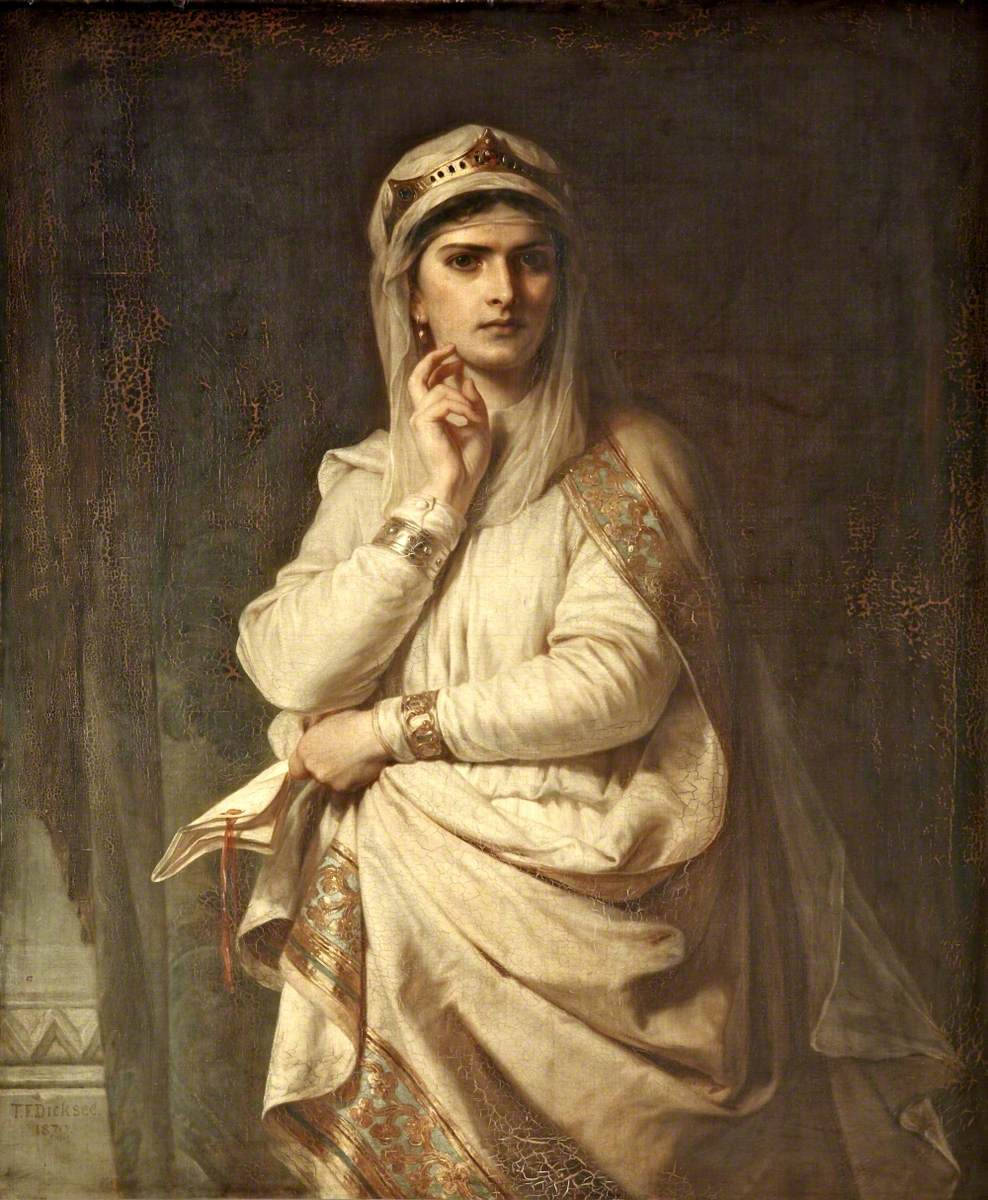
Lady Macbeth by Thomas Francis Dicksee

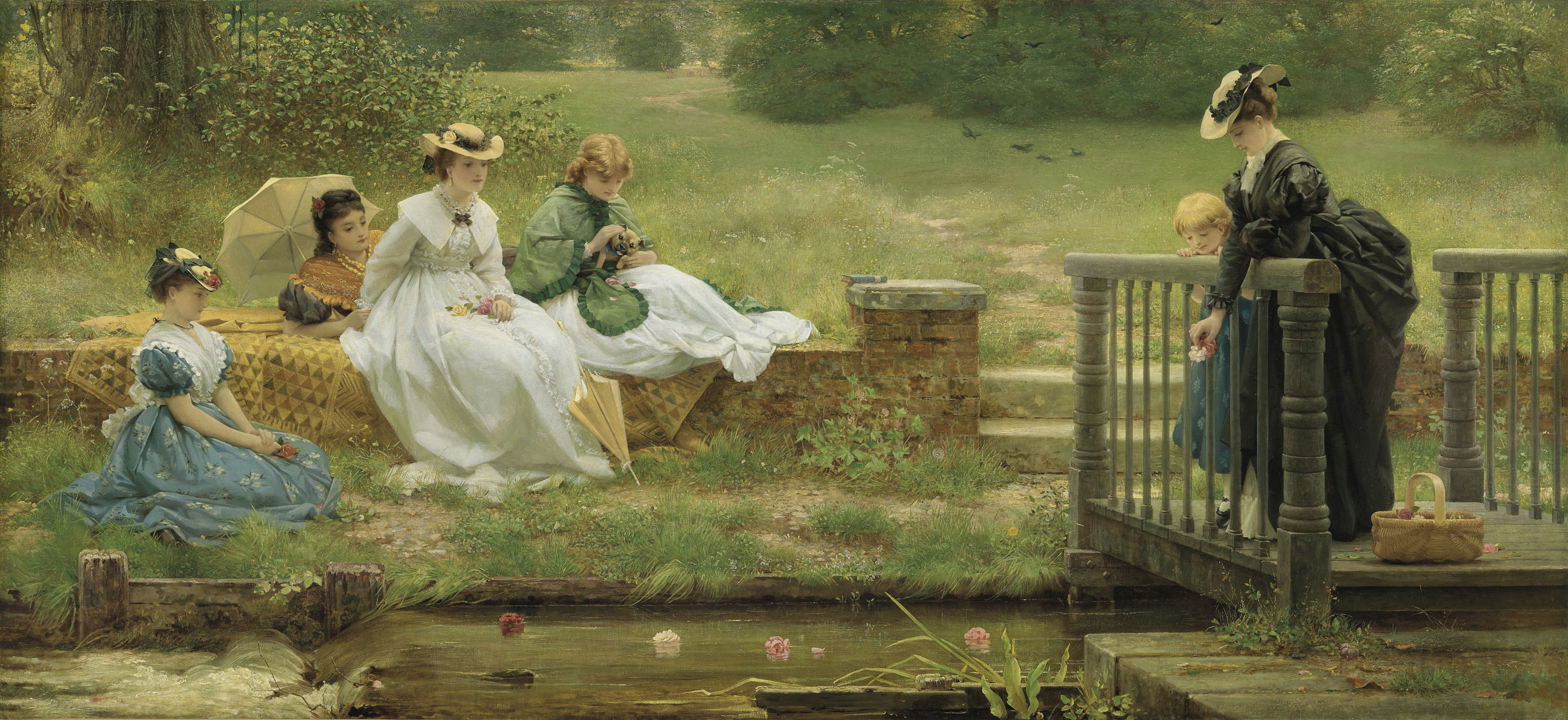
Fortunes by George Dunlop Leslie

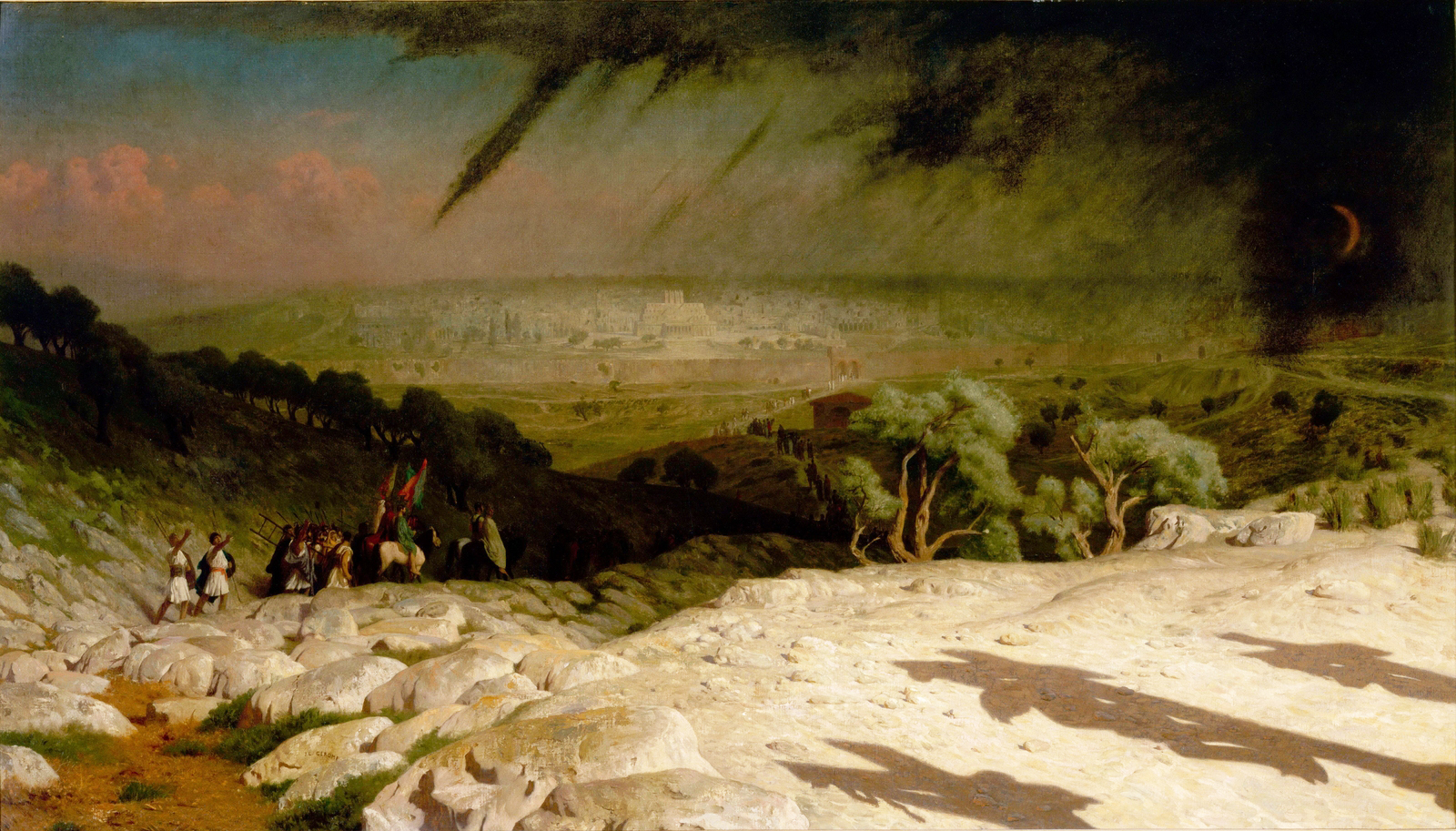
Jerusalem by Jean-Léon Gérôme

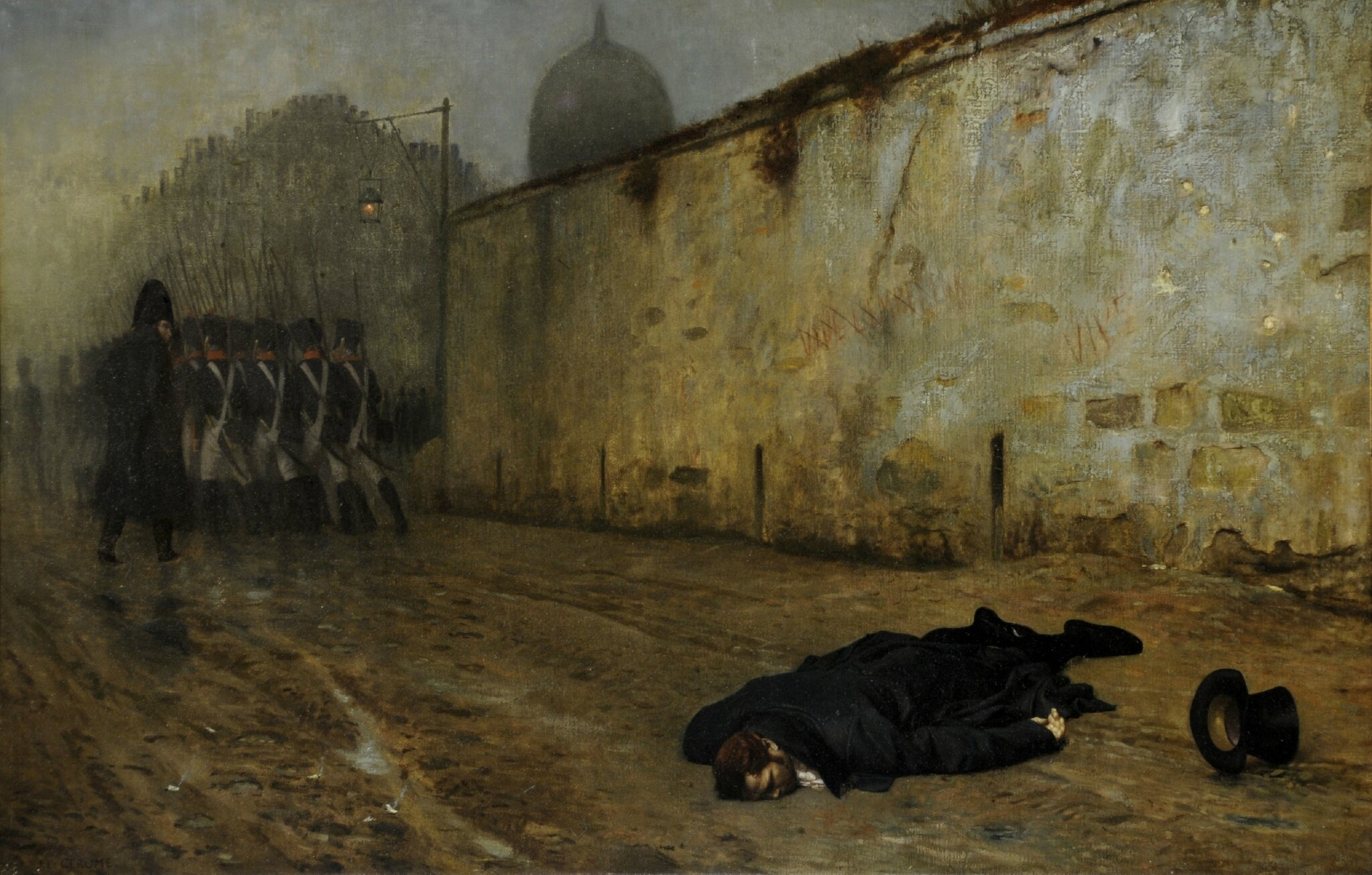
The Execution of Marshal Ney by Jean-Léon Gérôme

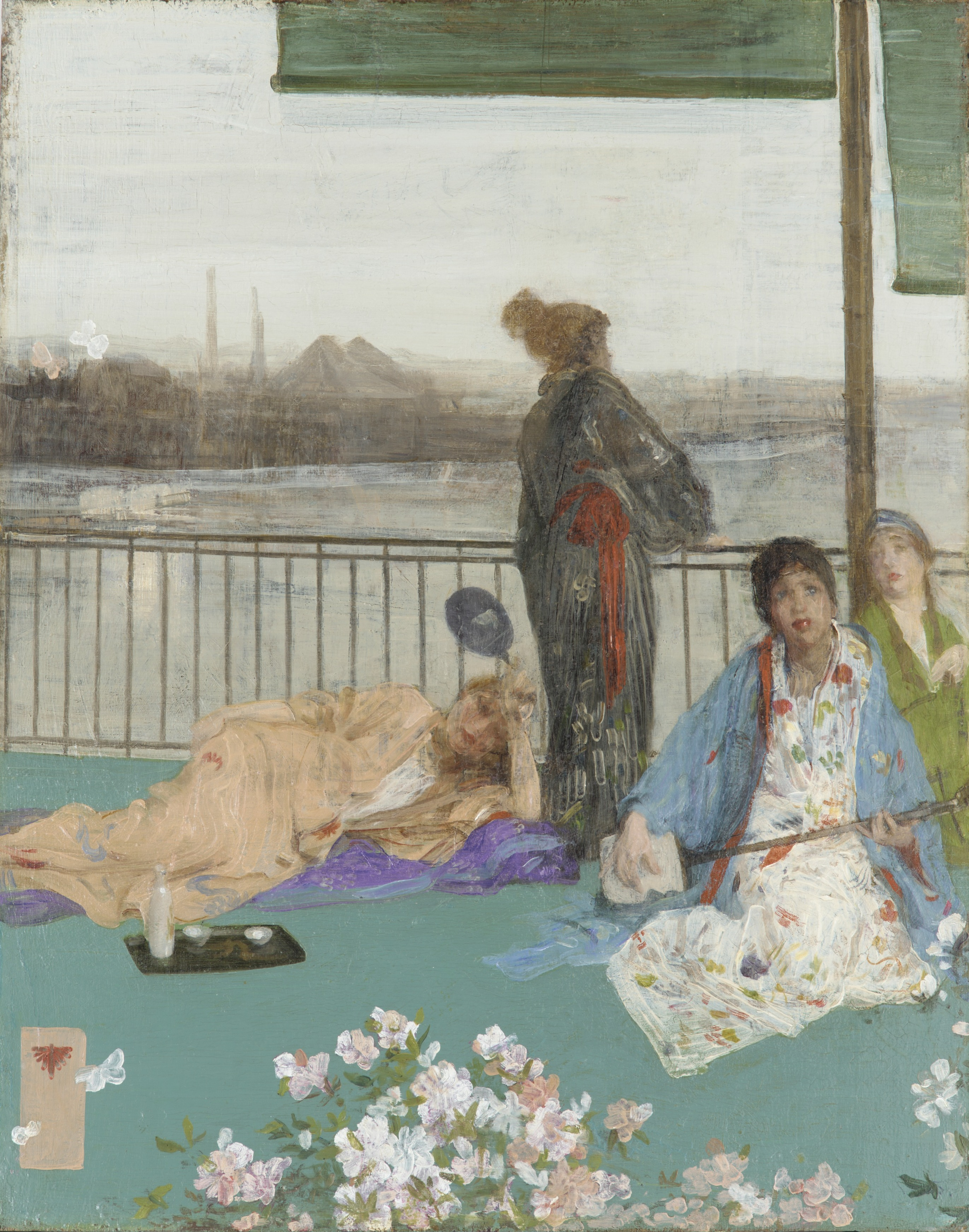
The Balcony by James McNeill Whistler

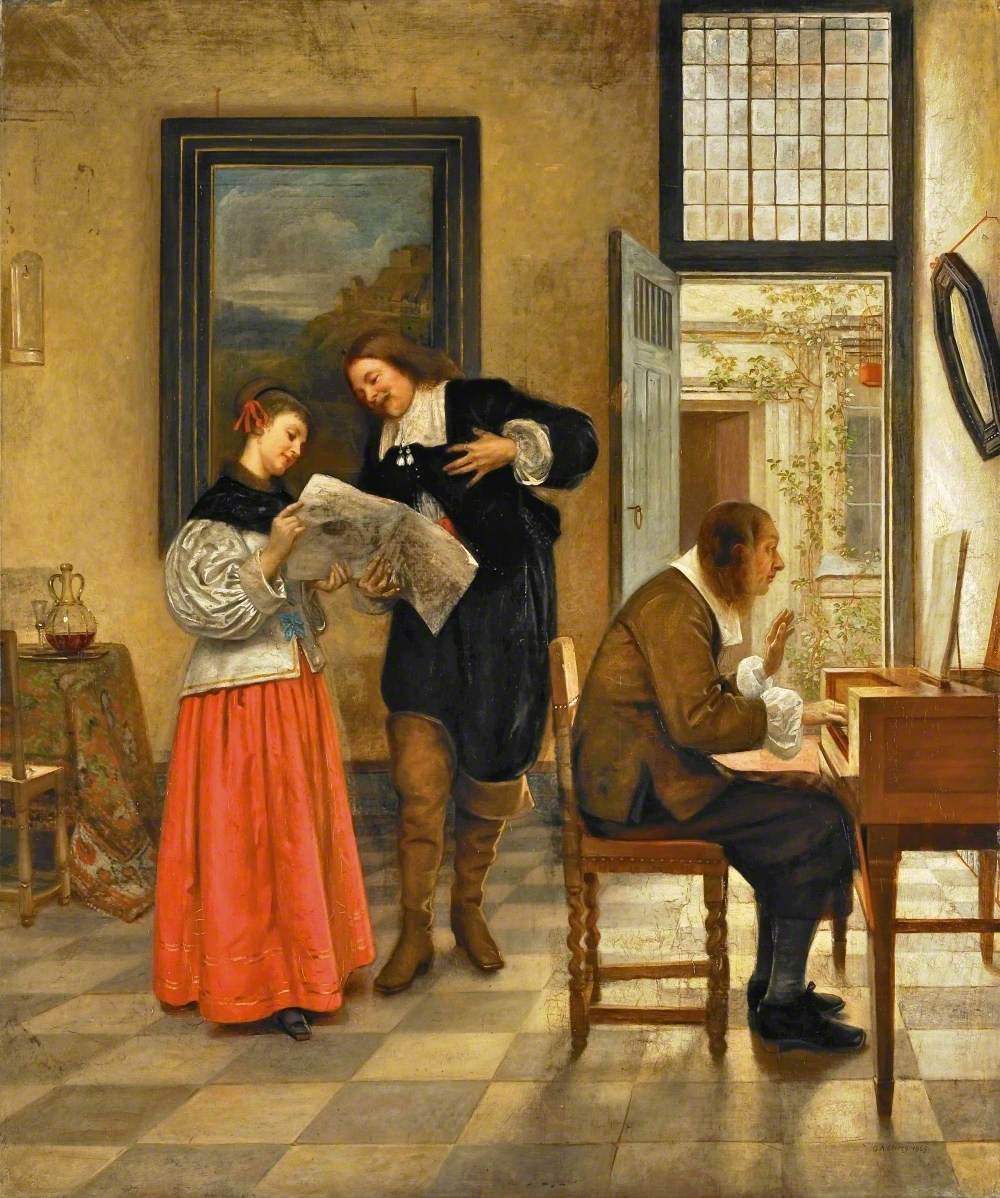
A Duet by George Adolphus Storey

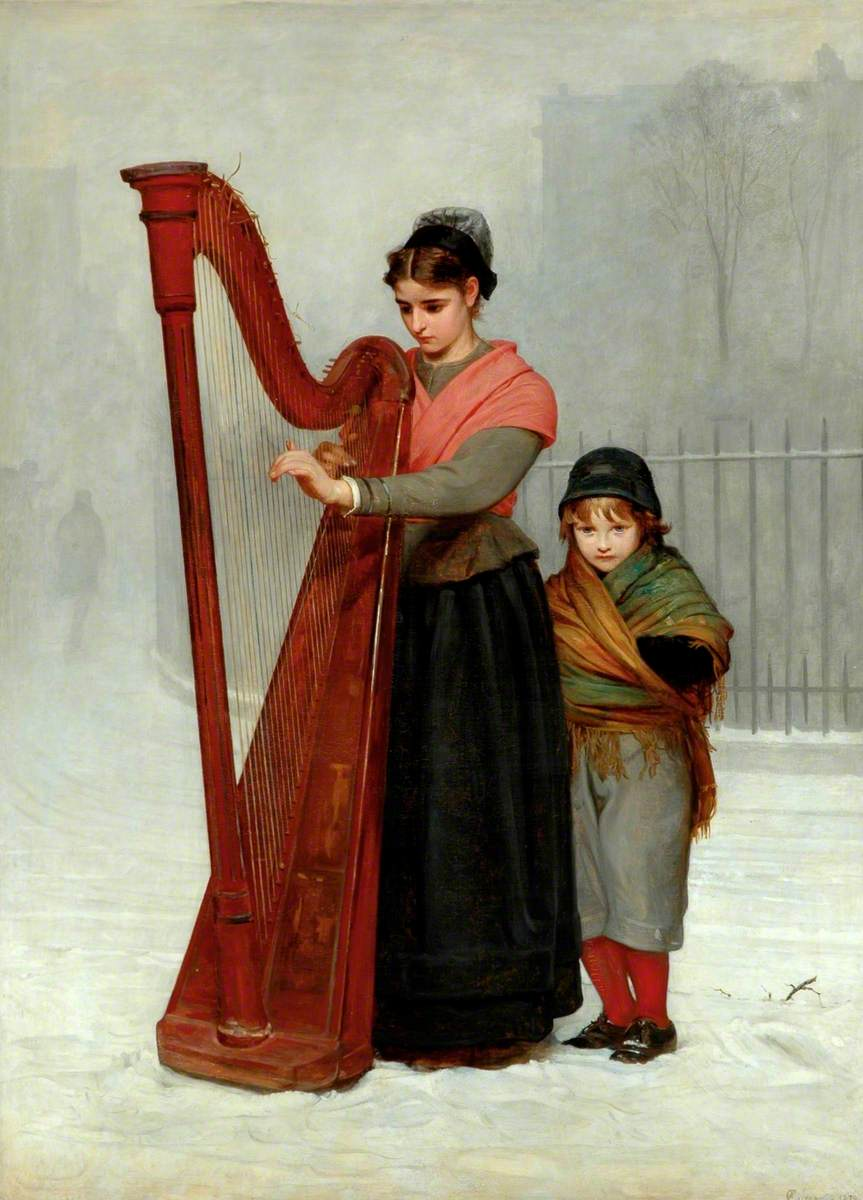
The Orphans by Philip Hermogenes Calderon

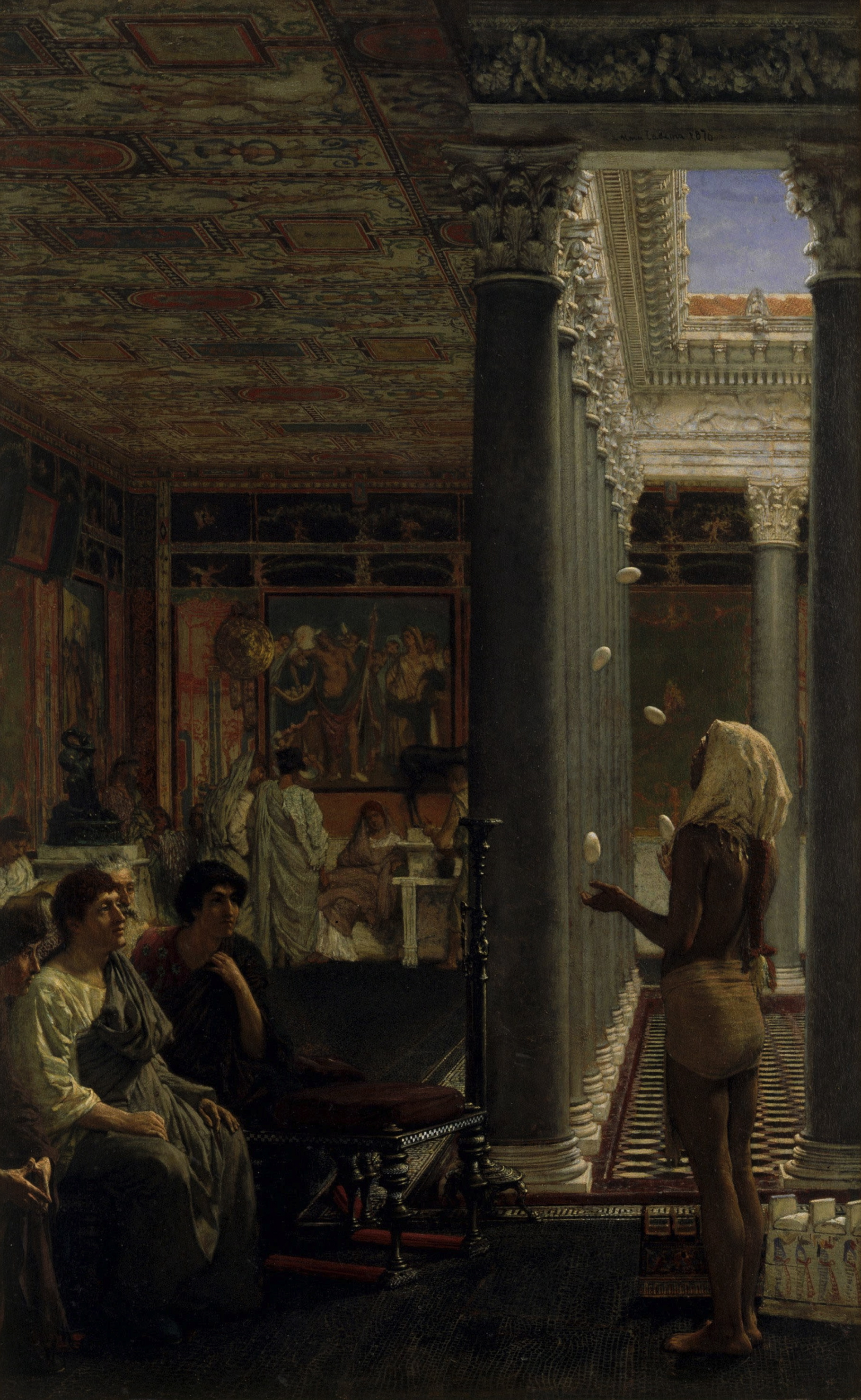
A Juggler by Lawrence Alma-Tadema

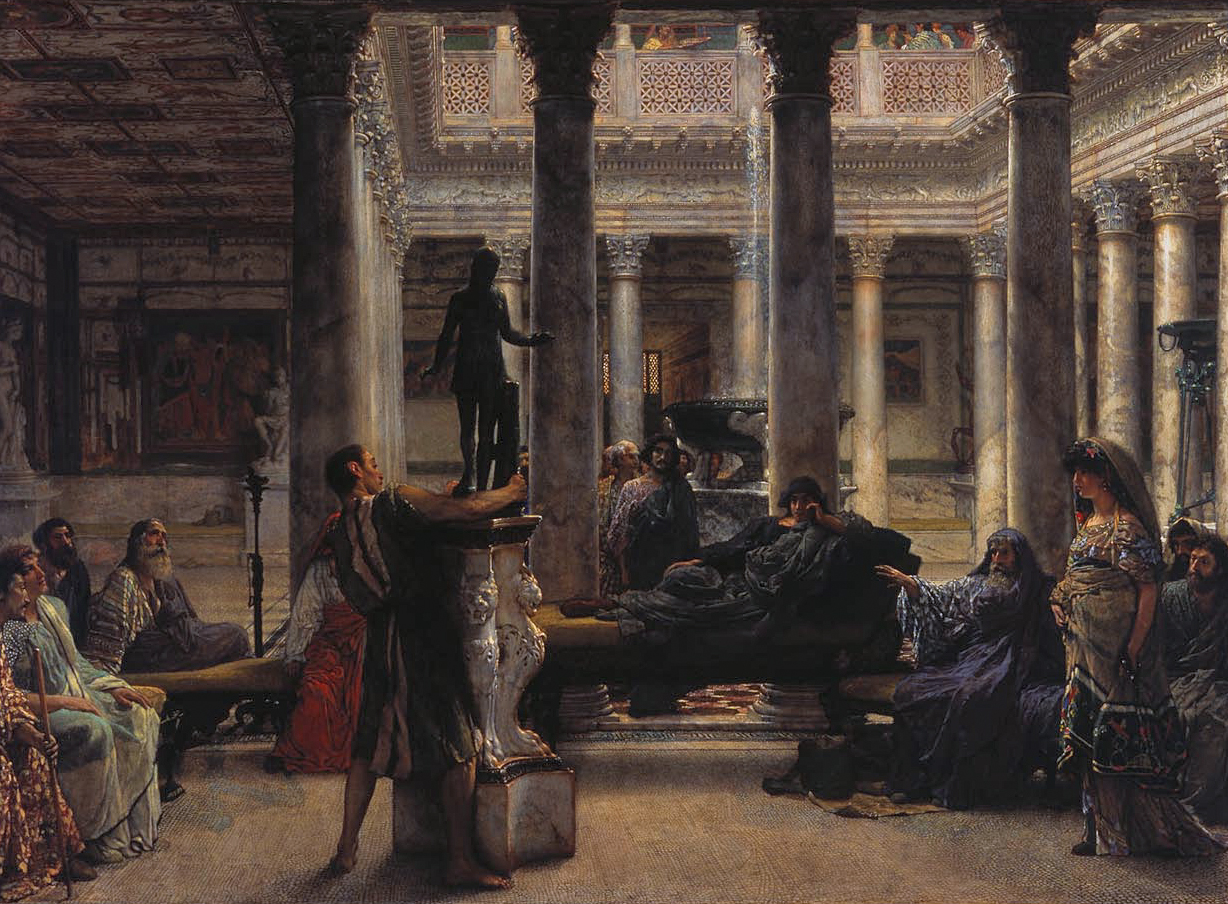
A Roman Amateur by Lawrence Alma-Tadema

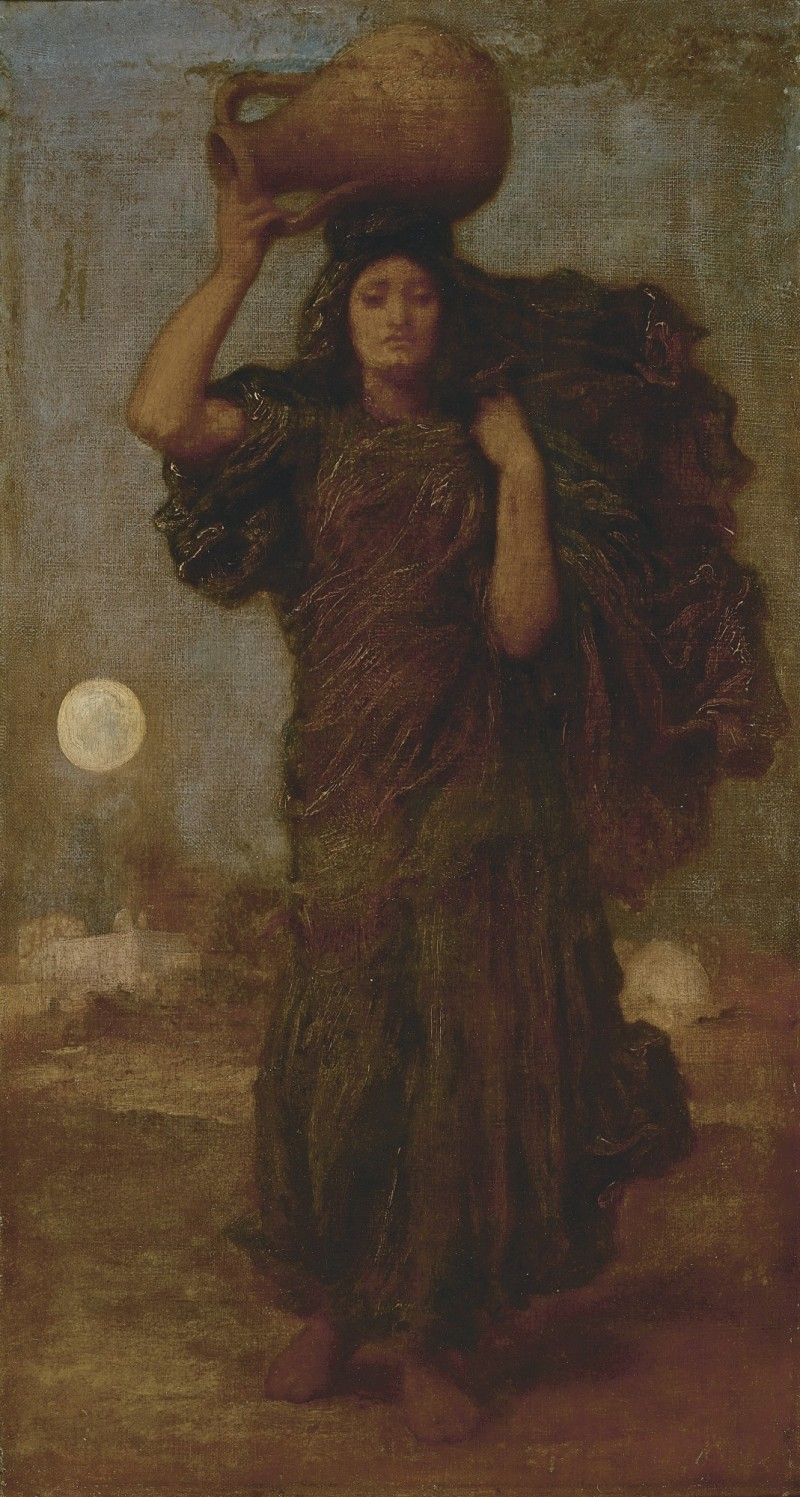
A Nile Woman by Frederic Leighton

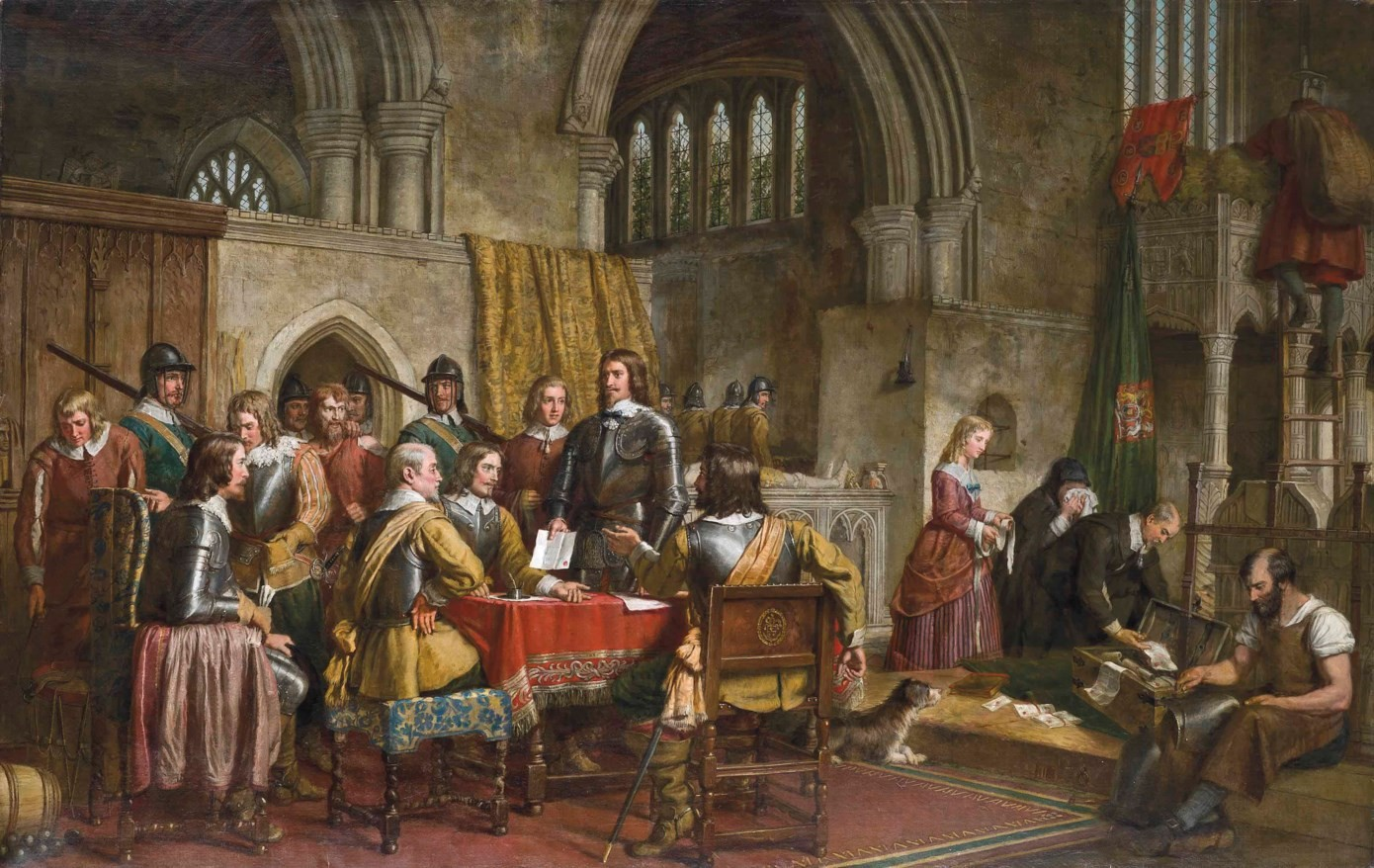
The Surrender of Arundel Castle to Sir William Waller by Charles Landseer

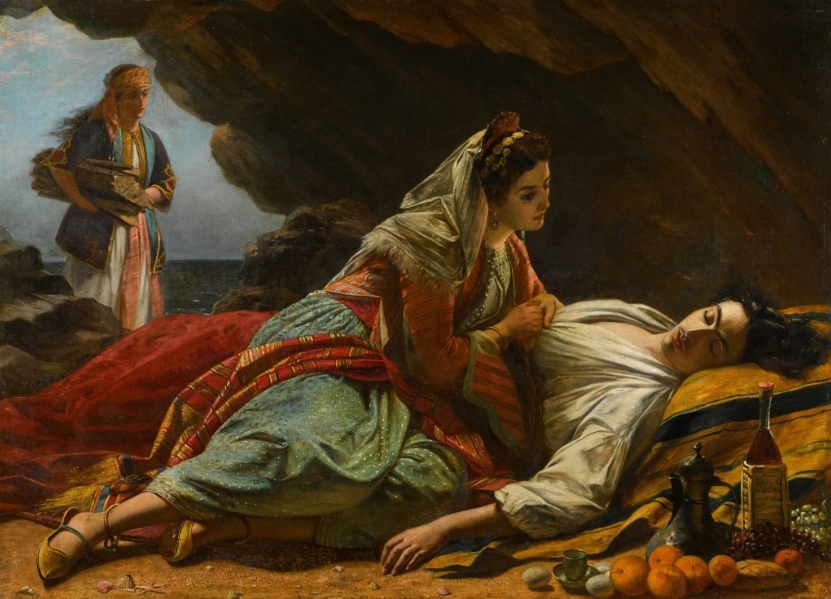
Haidee and Don Juan by Henry Nelson O'Neil

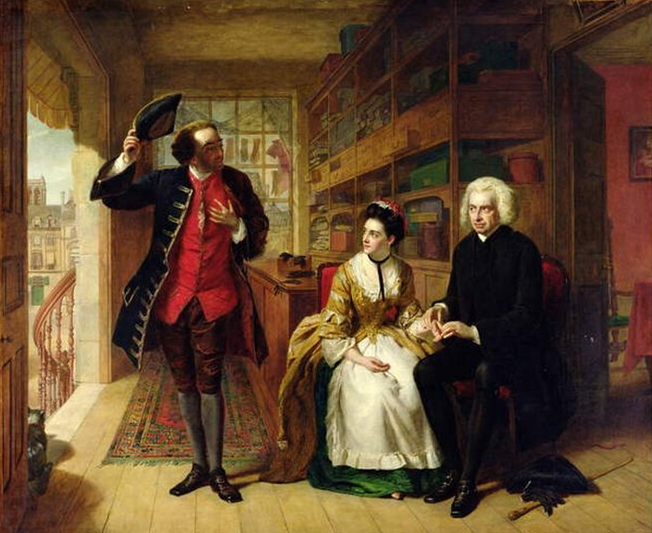
The Pulse, The Husband, Paris by William Powell Frith

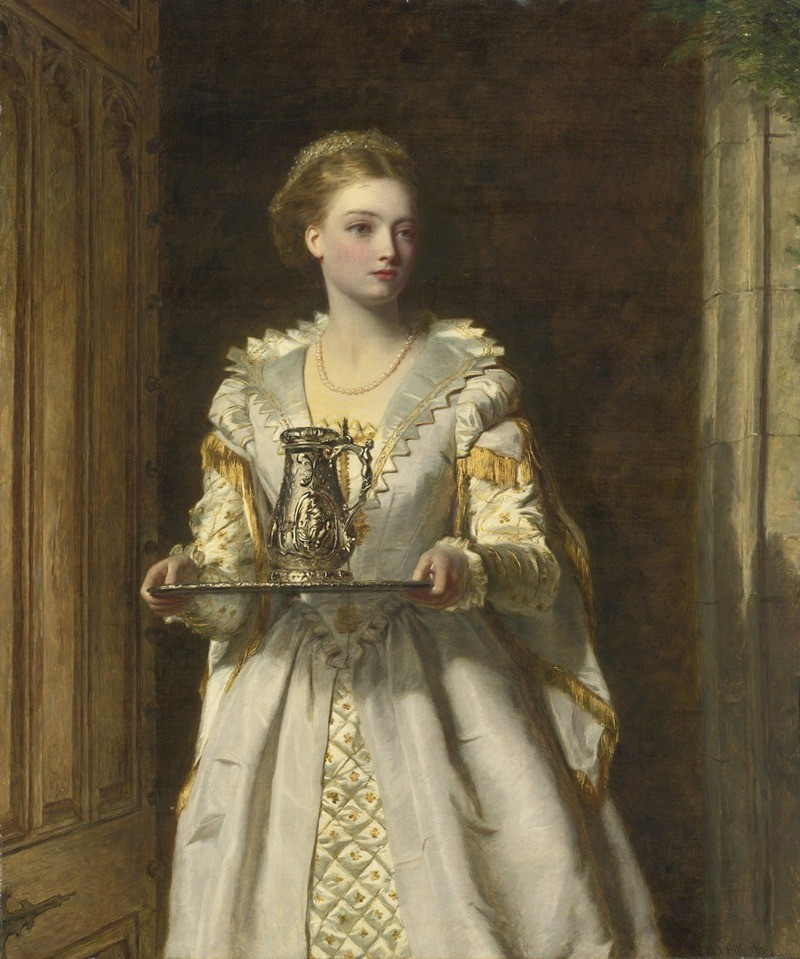
Gabrielle d'Estrées by William Powell Frith

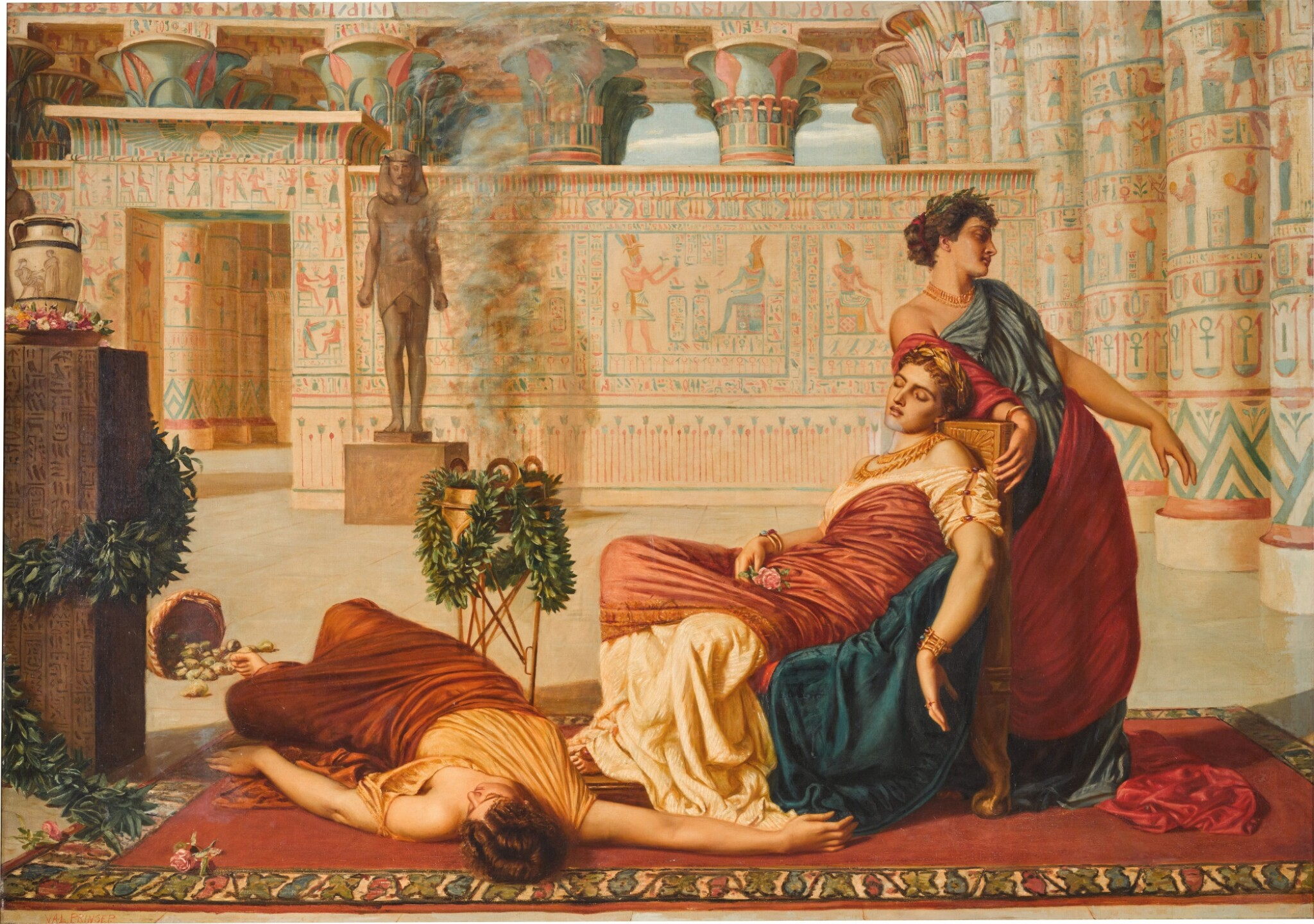
The Death of Cleopatra by Valentine Cameron Prinsep

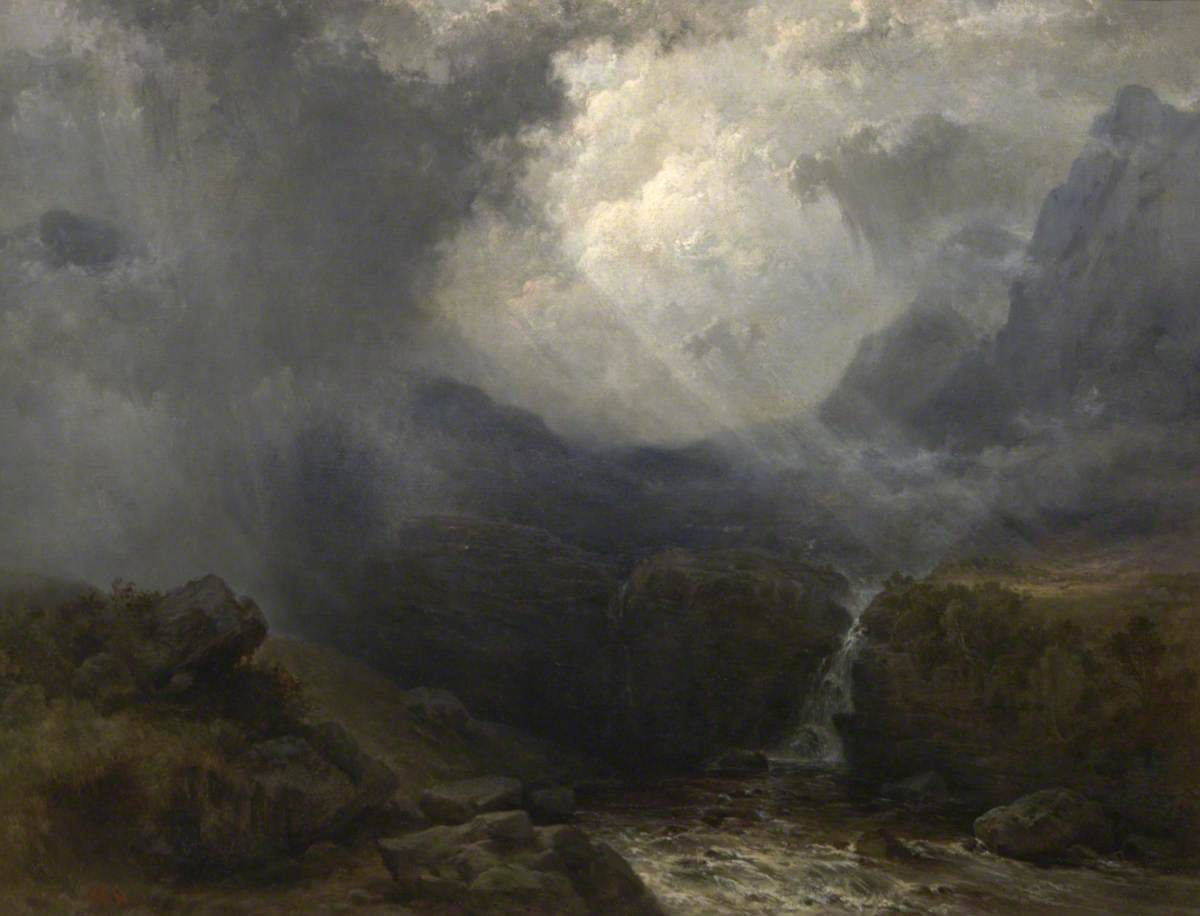
The Rift in the Gloom by George Edwards Hering

The Proposal of the Jews to Ferdinand and Isabella by Solomon Hart

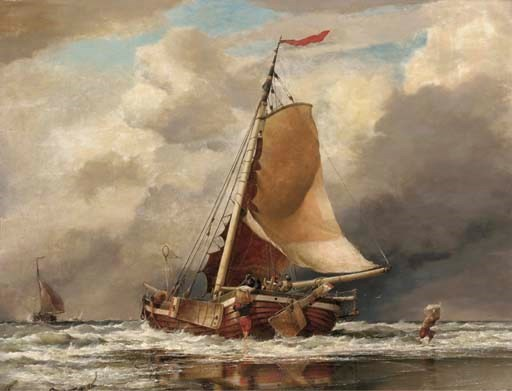
Landing Fish, Coast of Holland by Edward William Cooke

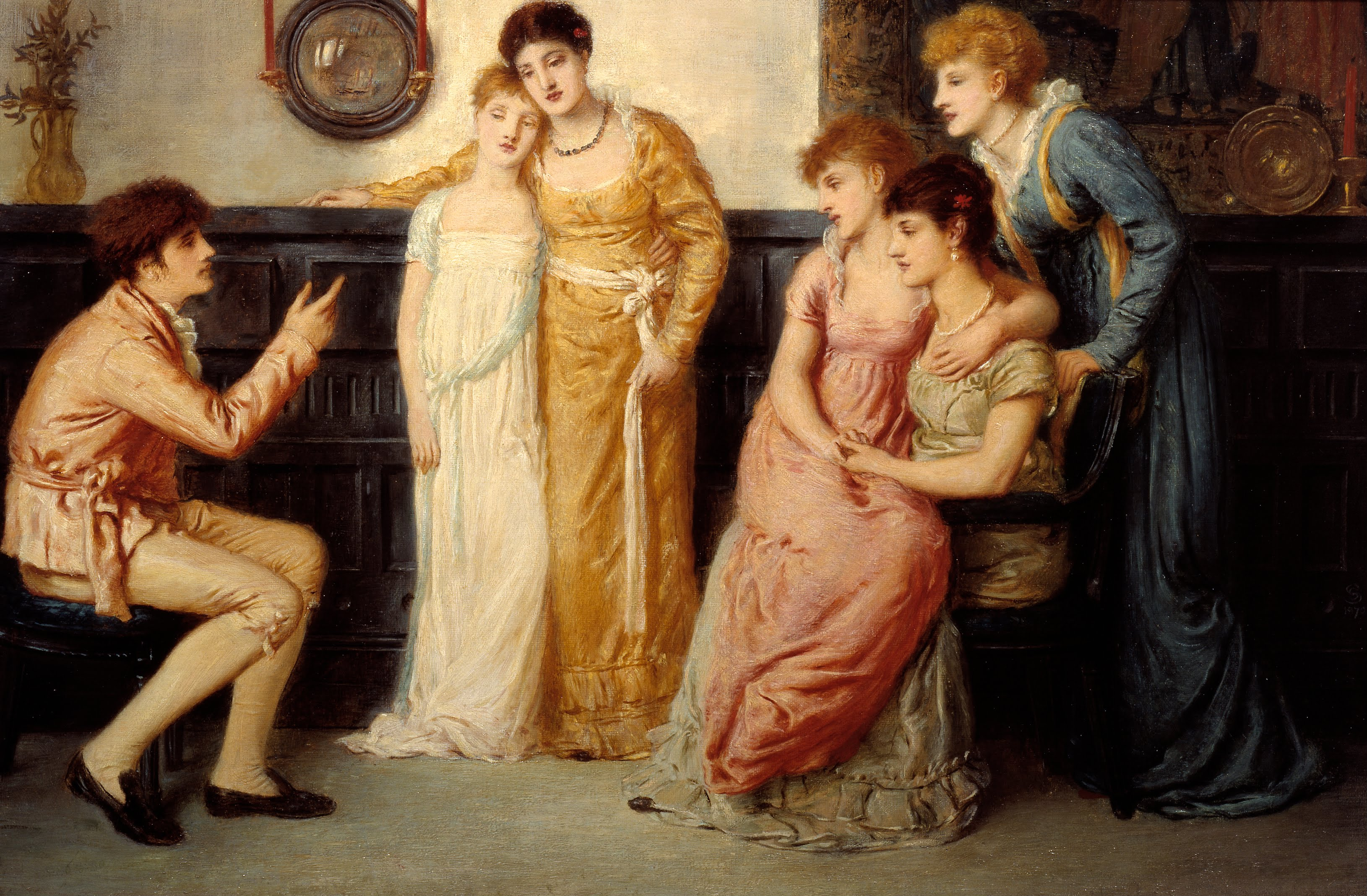
A Youth Relating Tales to Ladies by Simeon Solomon

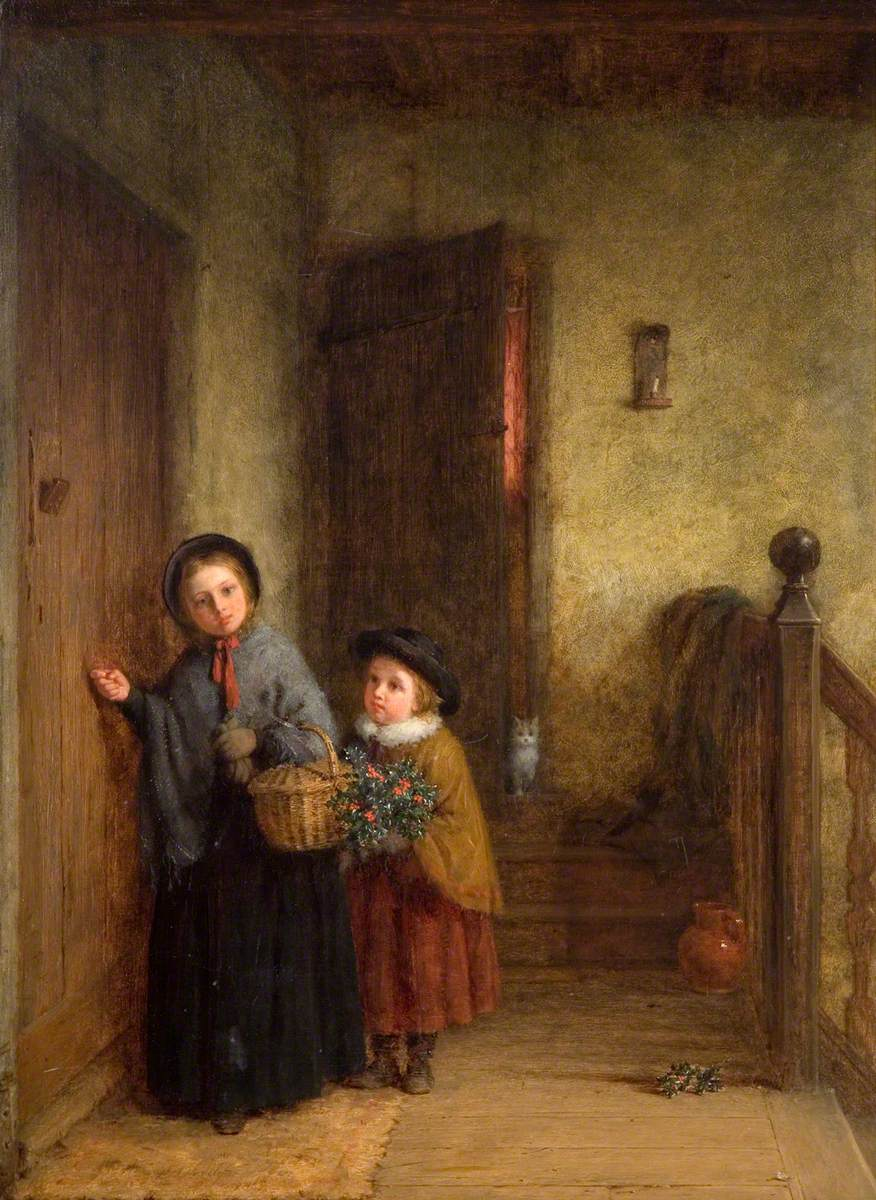
Christmas Visitors by Frederick Daniel Hardy

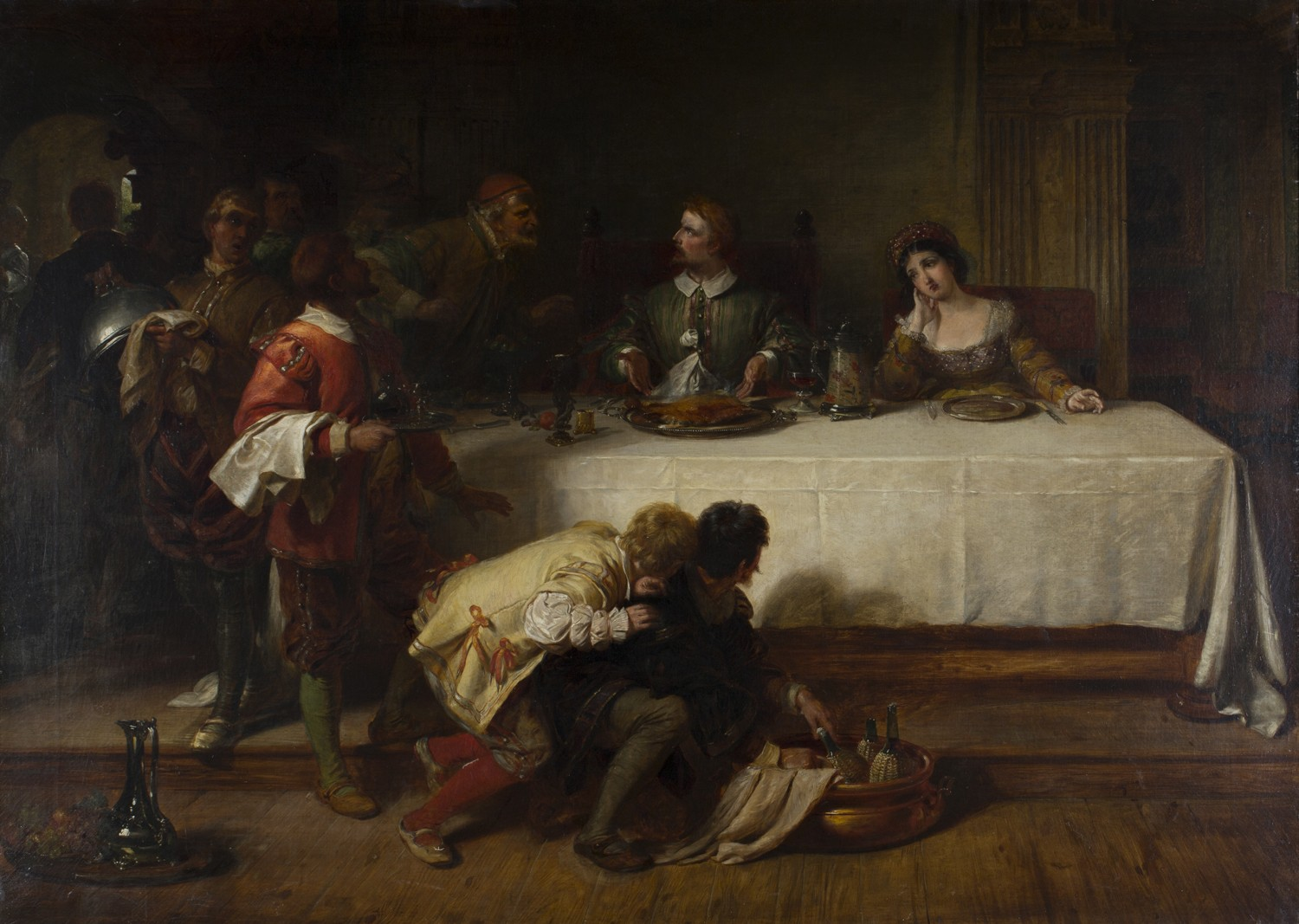
Katharine and Petruchio's Wedding Supper by Henry Courtney Selous

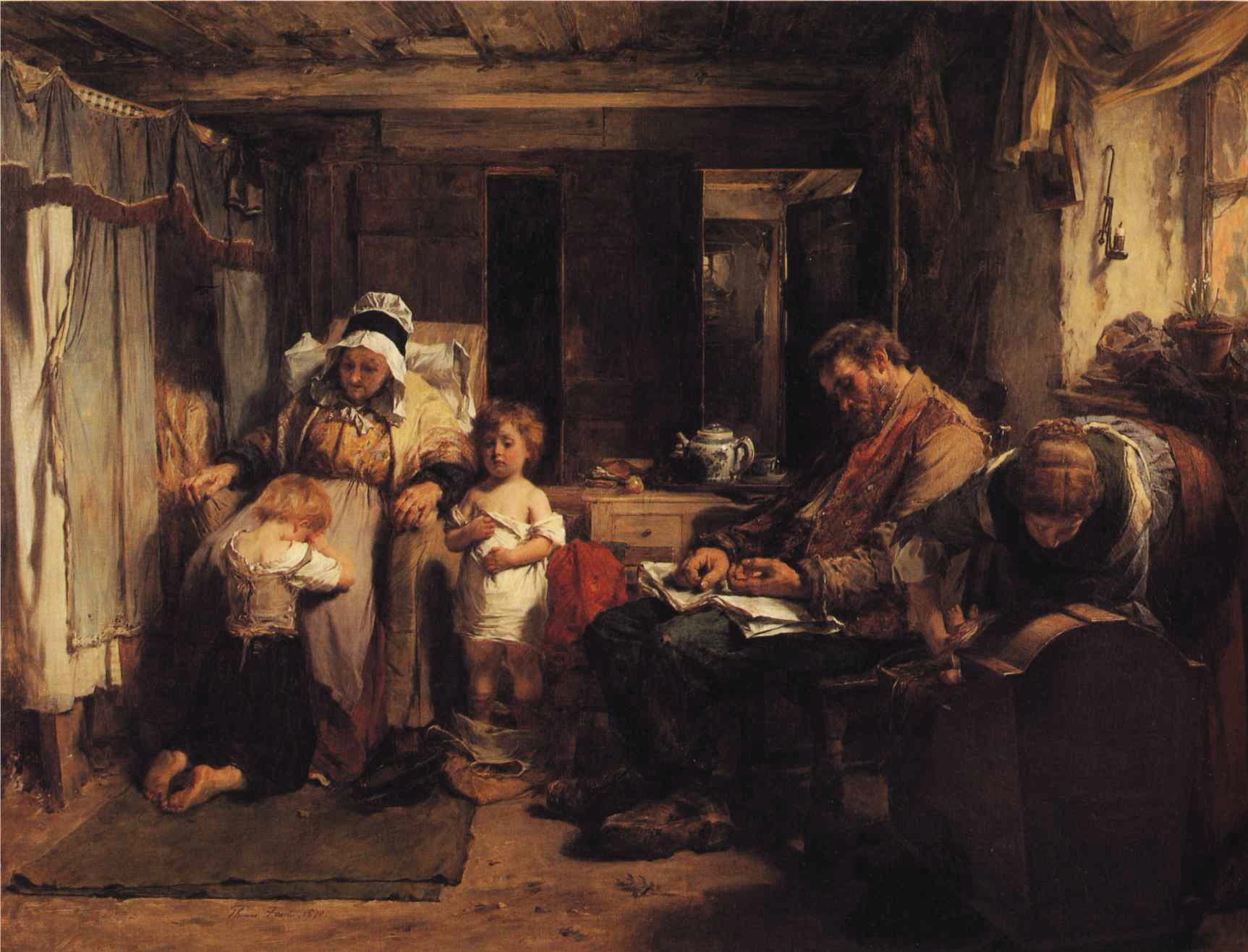
When the Day is Done by Thomas Faed

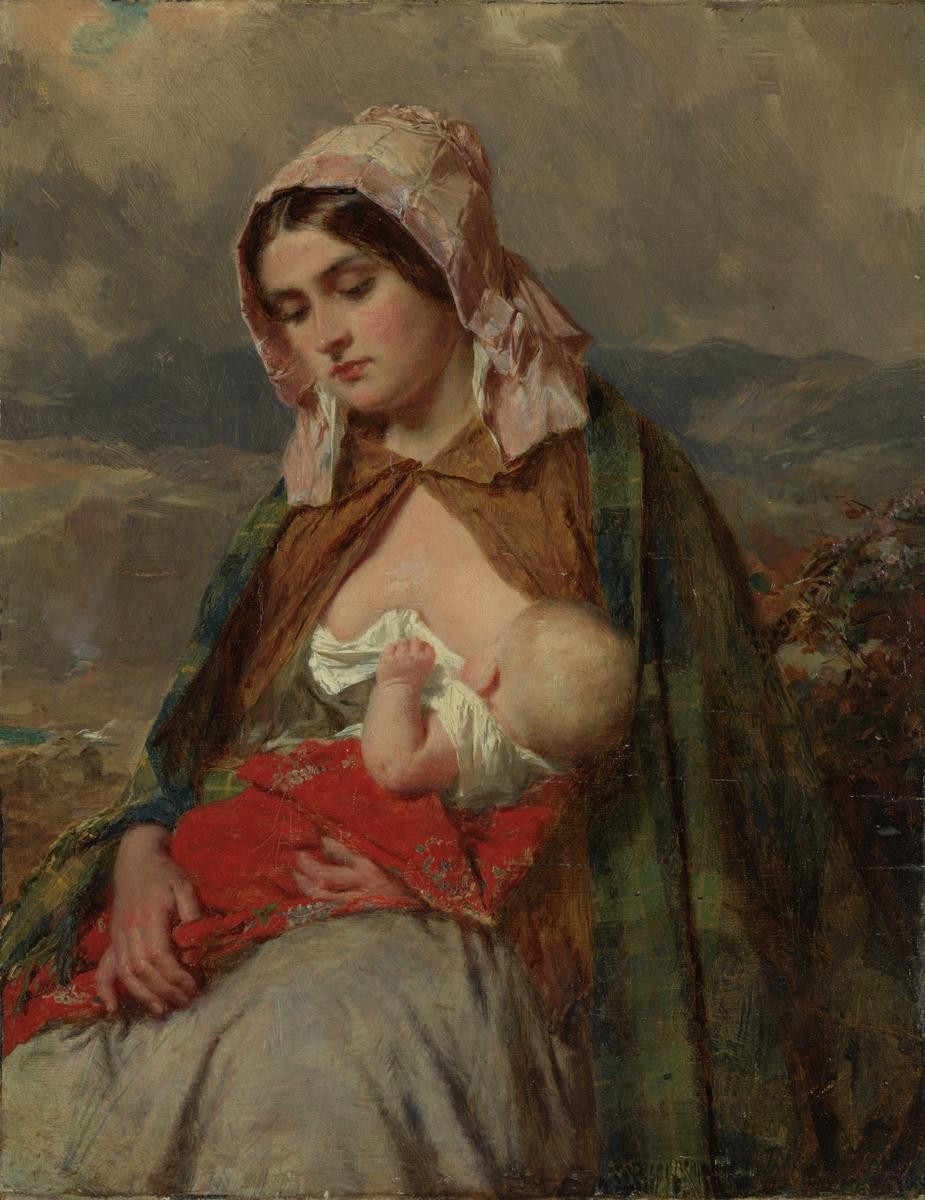
Highland Mother by Thomas Faed

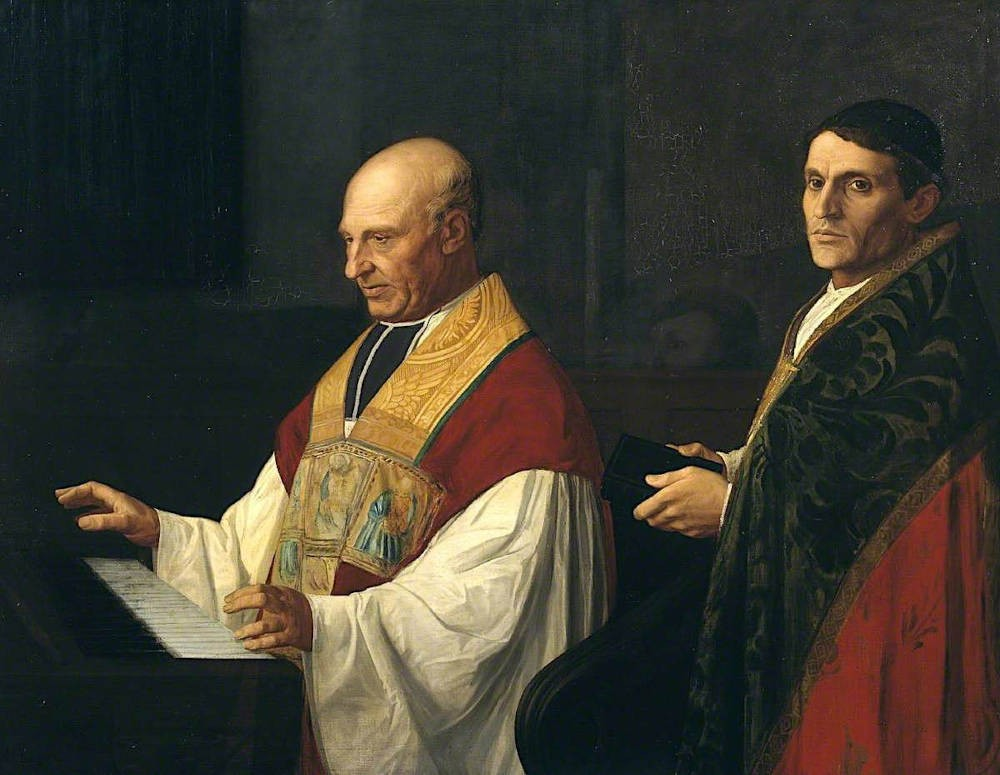
Prêtre au Lutrin by Alphonse Legros

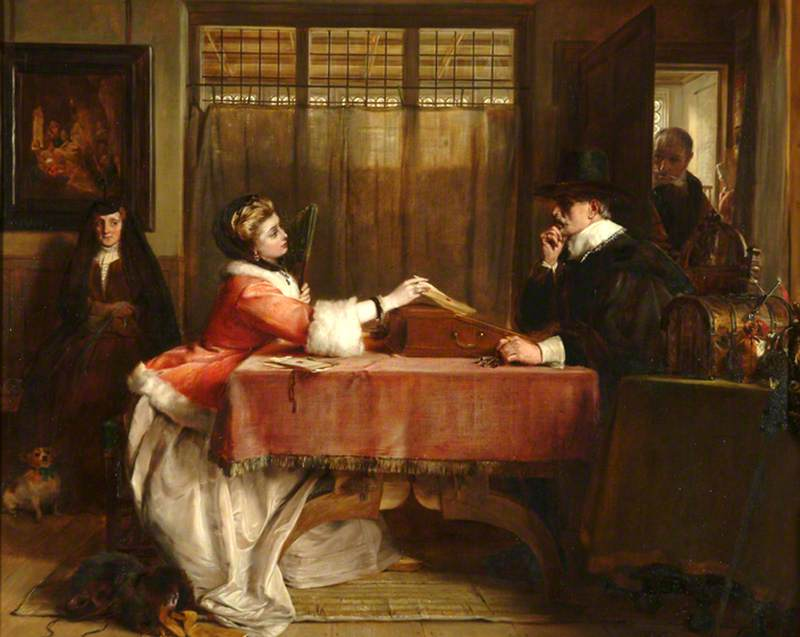
The Banker's Private Room, Negotiating a Loan by John Callcott Horsley

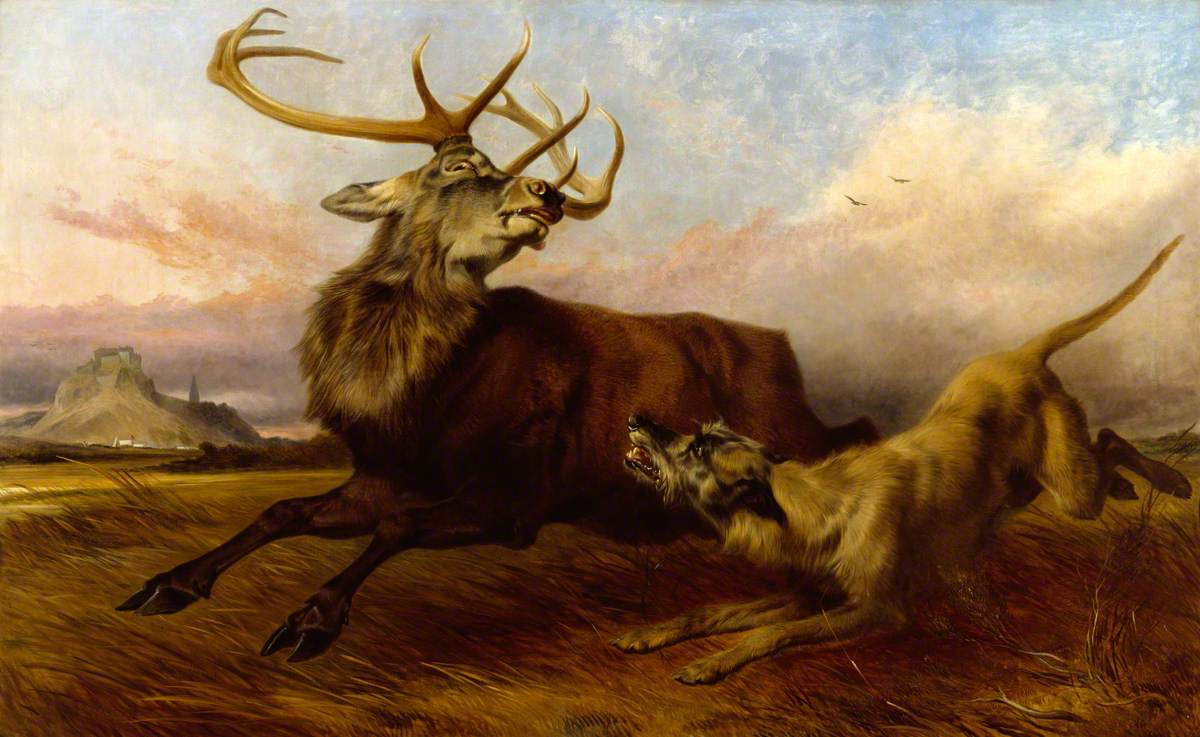
The Chase by Richard Ansdell

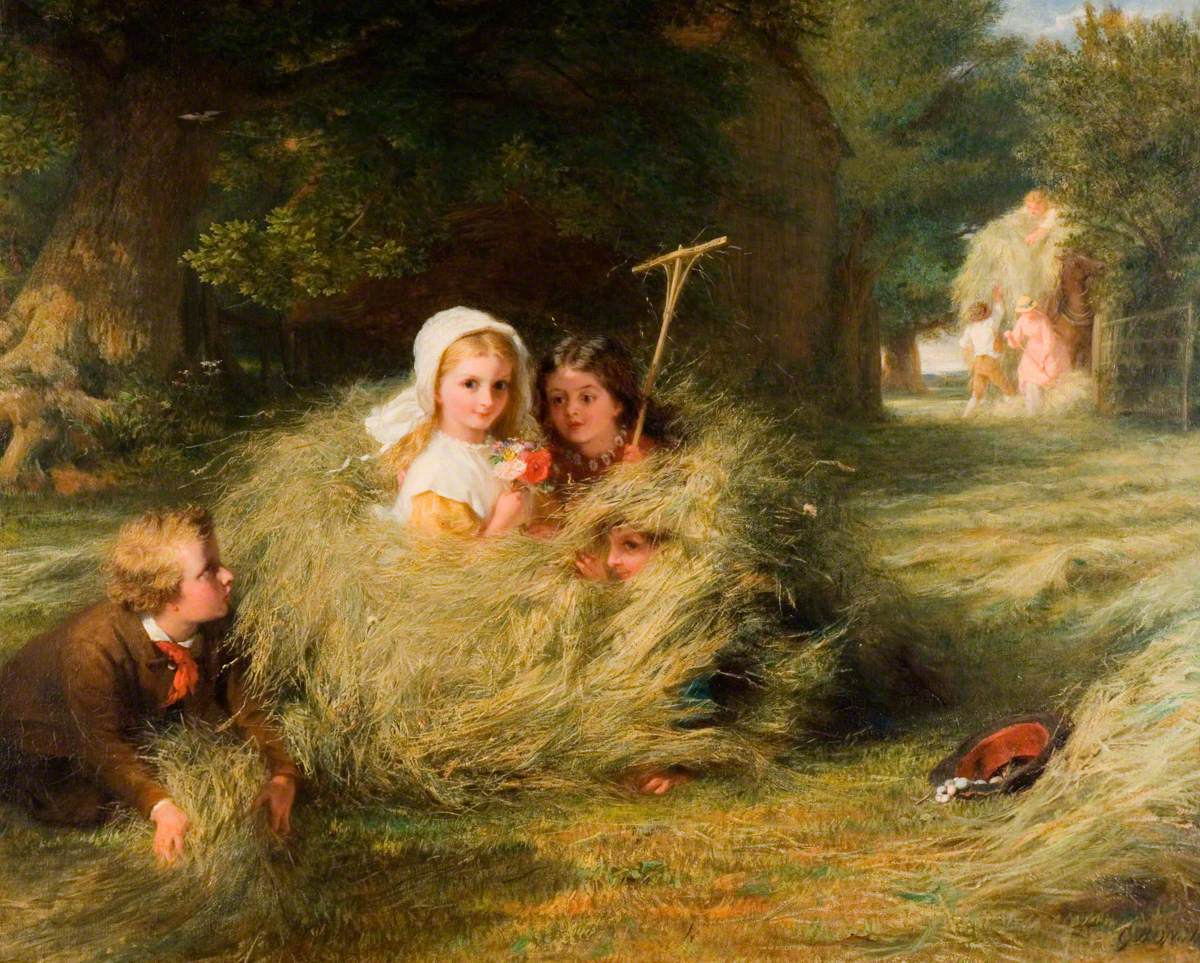
Nestlings by George Bernard O'Neill

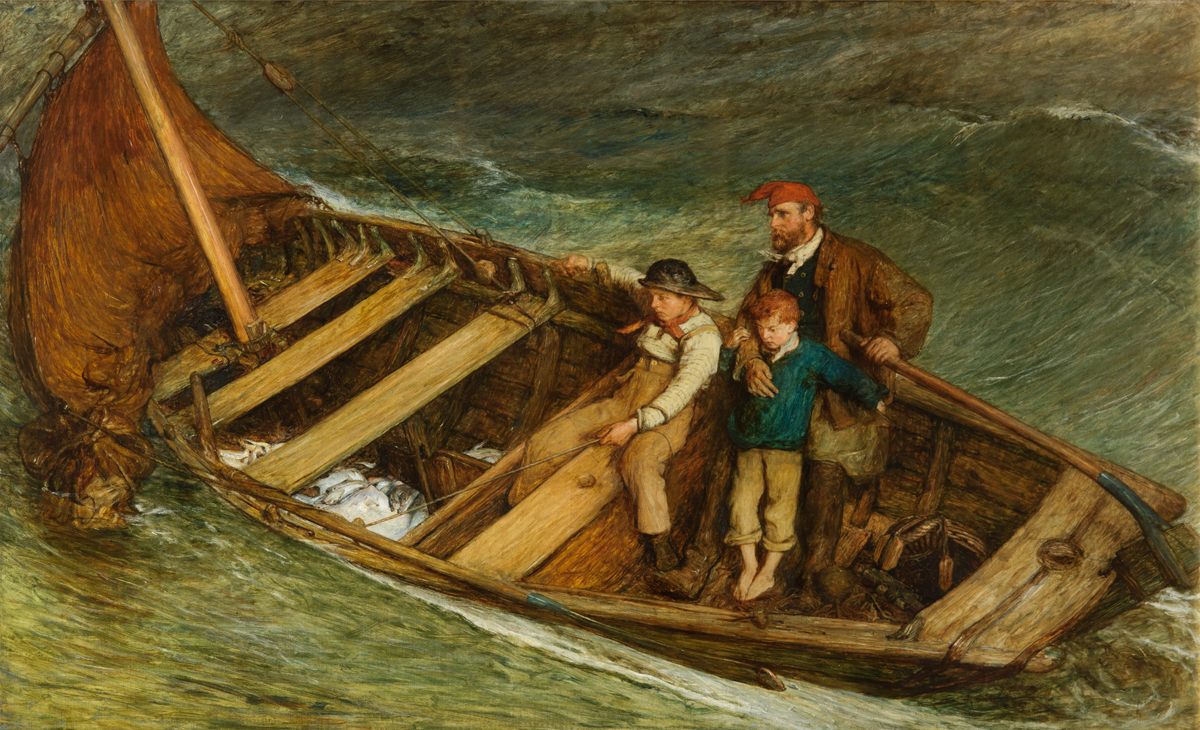
Toilers of the Sea by William Quiller Orchardson

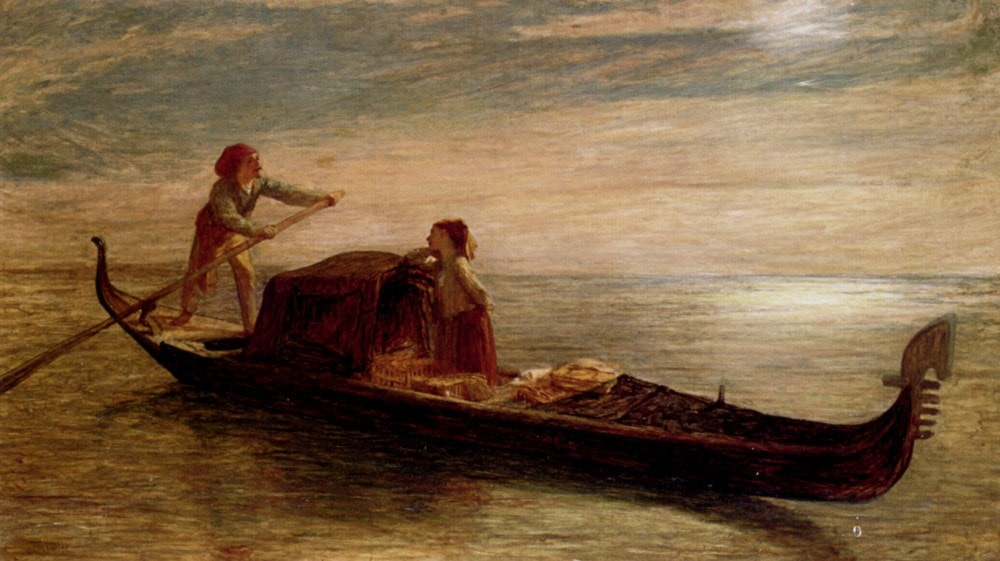
The Market Girl From The Lido by William Quiller Orchardson

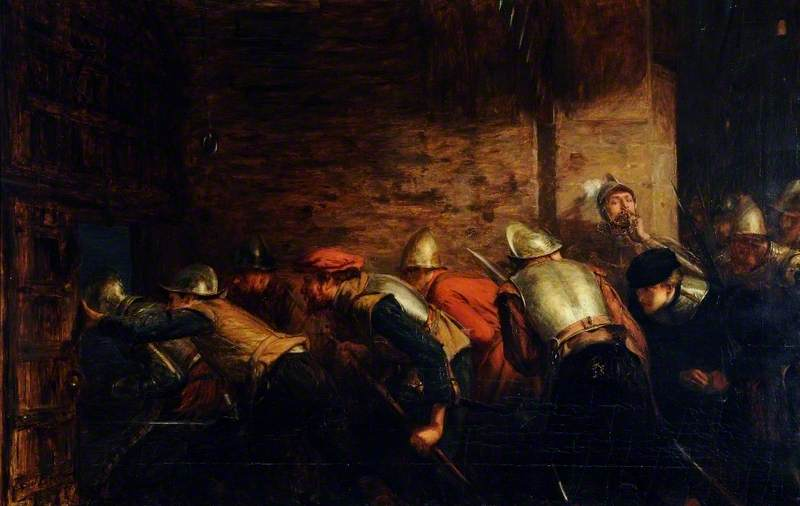
The Sally by John Pettie

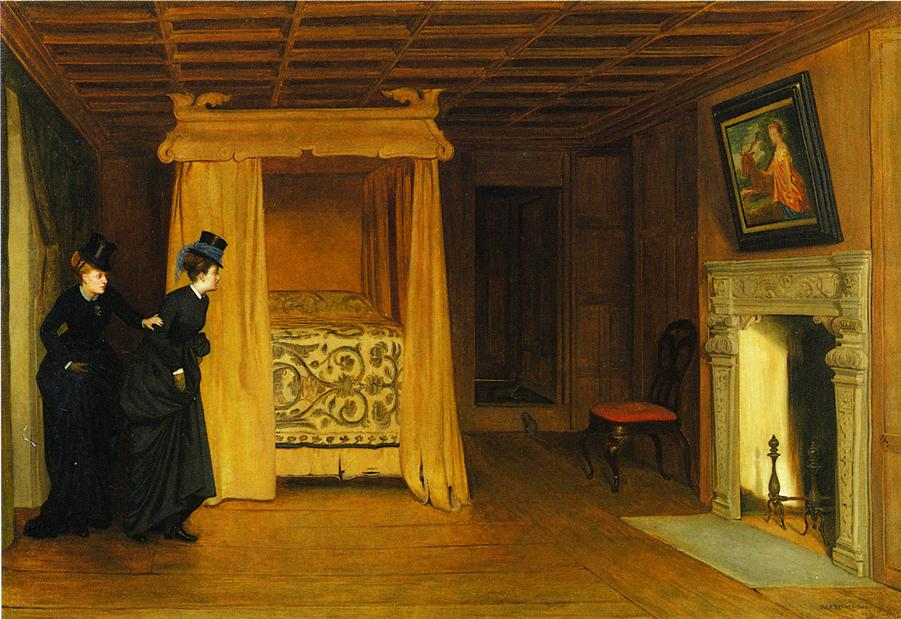
A Visit to the Haunted Chamber by William Frederick Yeames

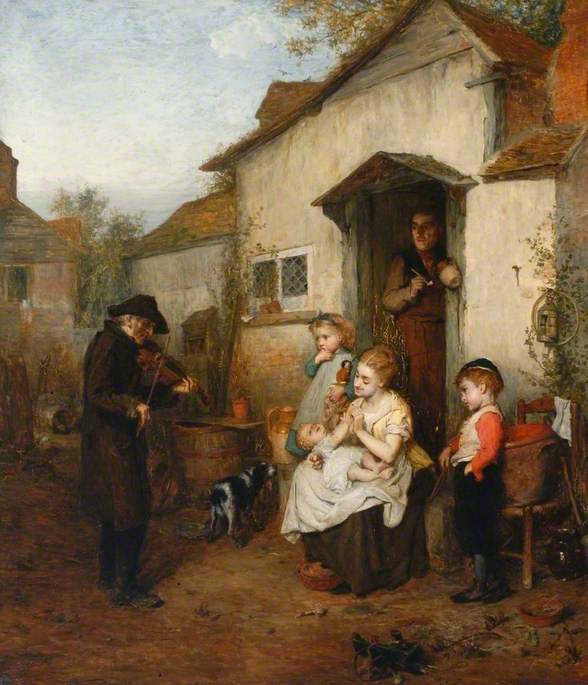
A Wandering Minstrel by John Burr

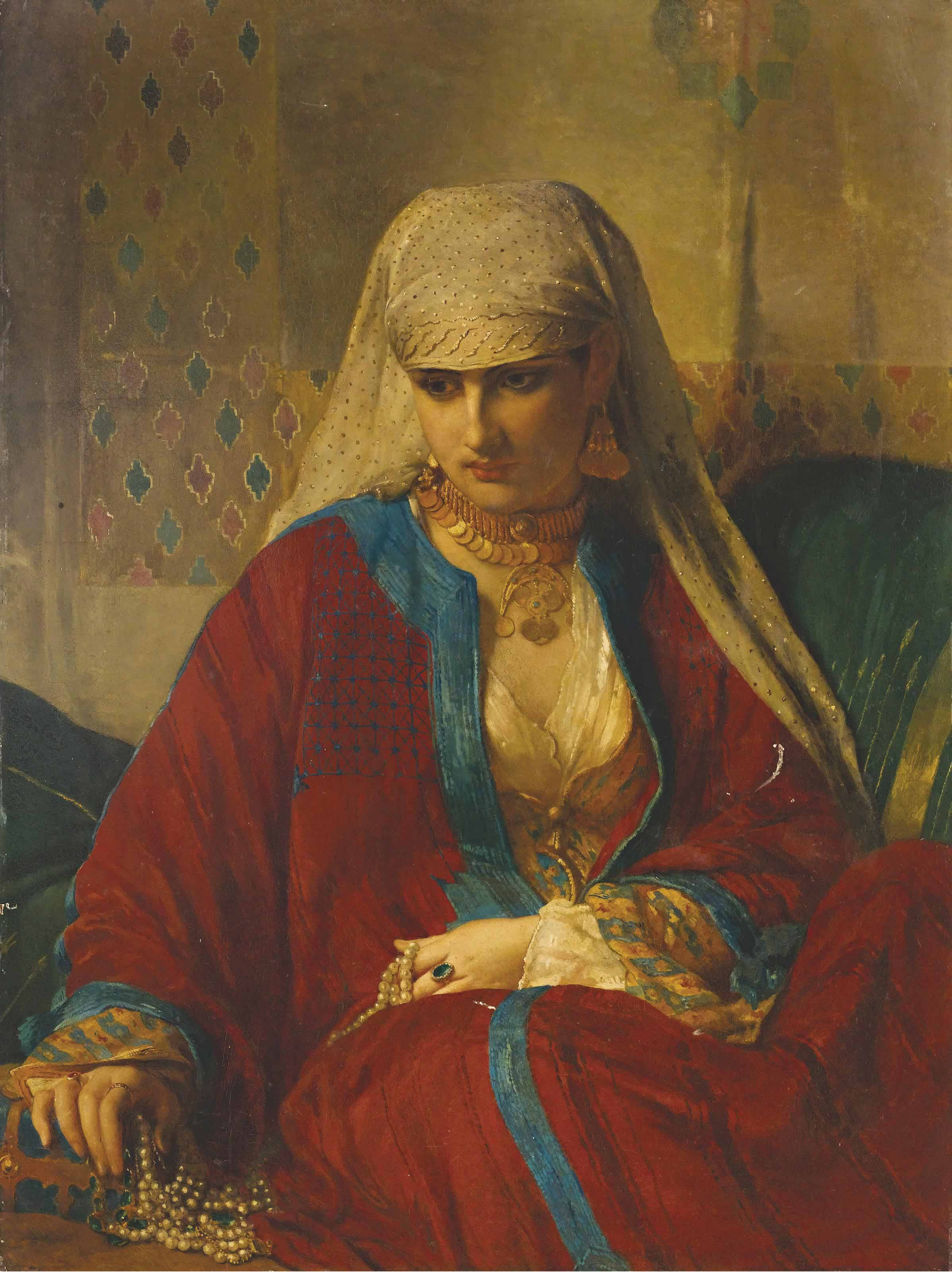
Souvenir of the Orient by Jean François Portaels

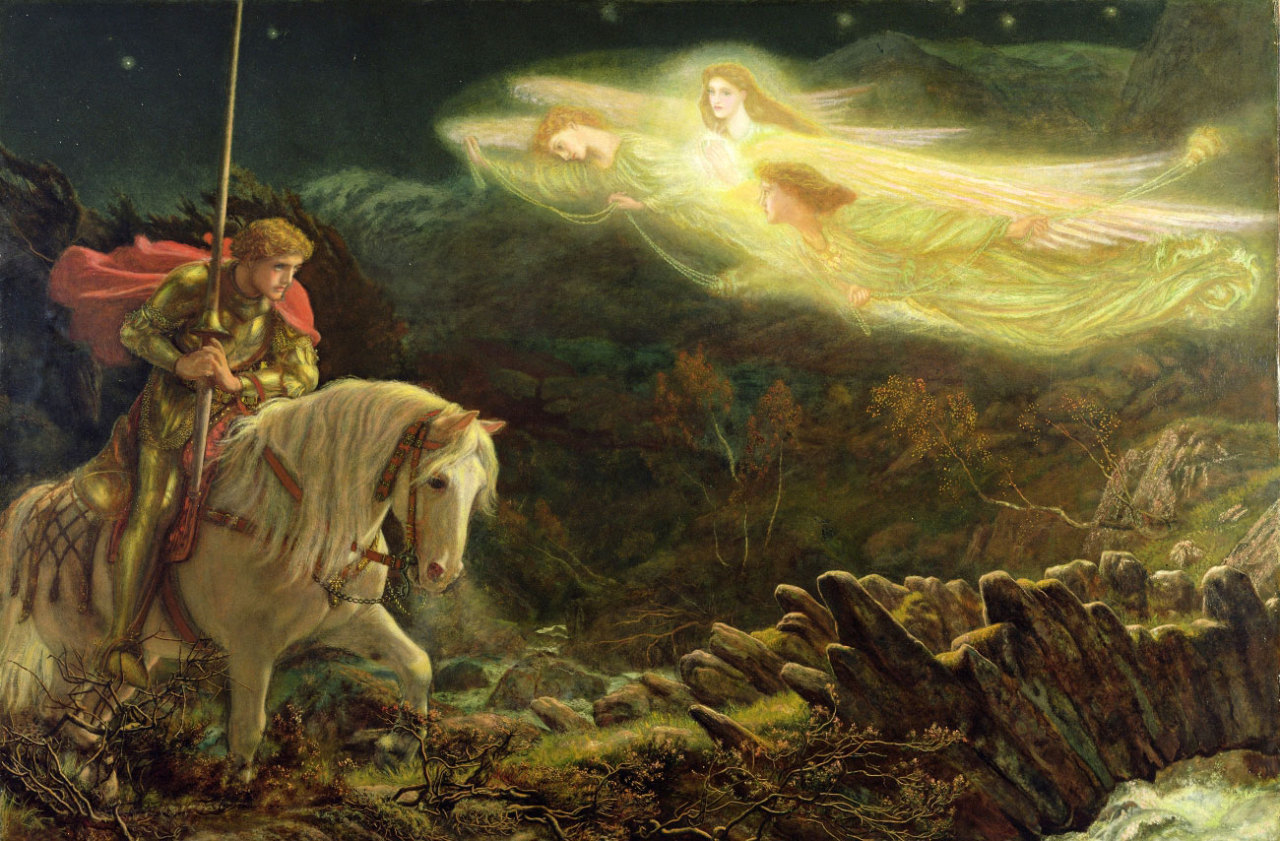
Sir Galahad by Arthur Hughes

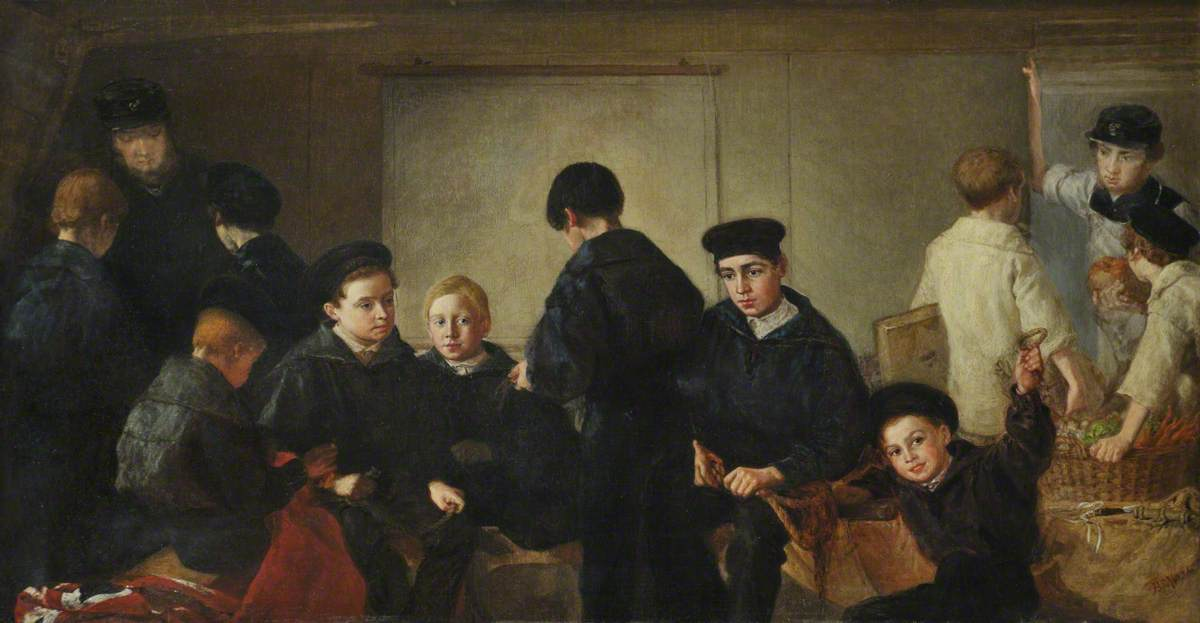
Saved from the Streets, Boys on Board the Chichester Training Ship by Barnett Samuel Marks

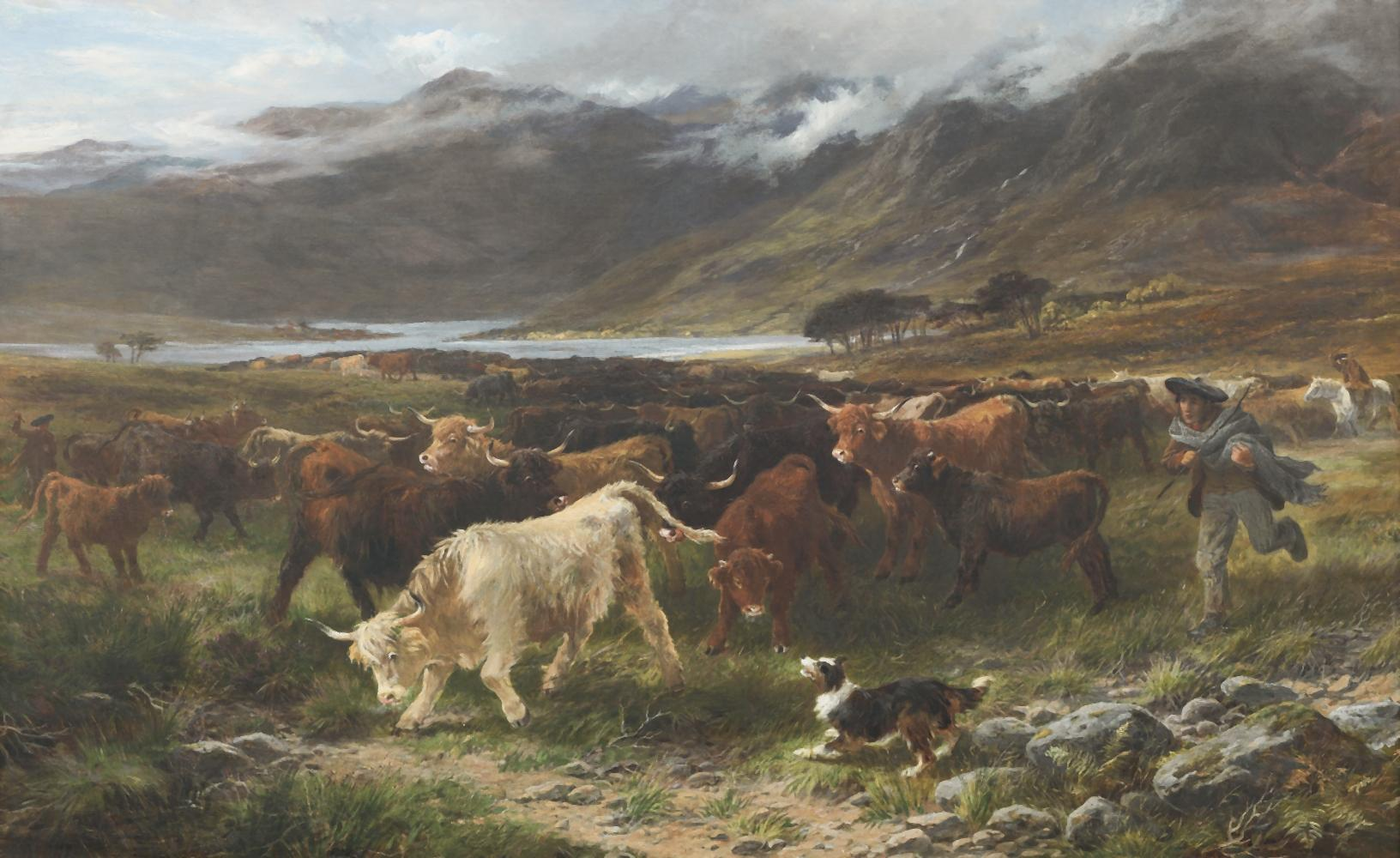
Turning the Drove by Henry Garland

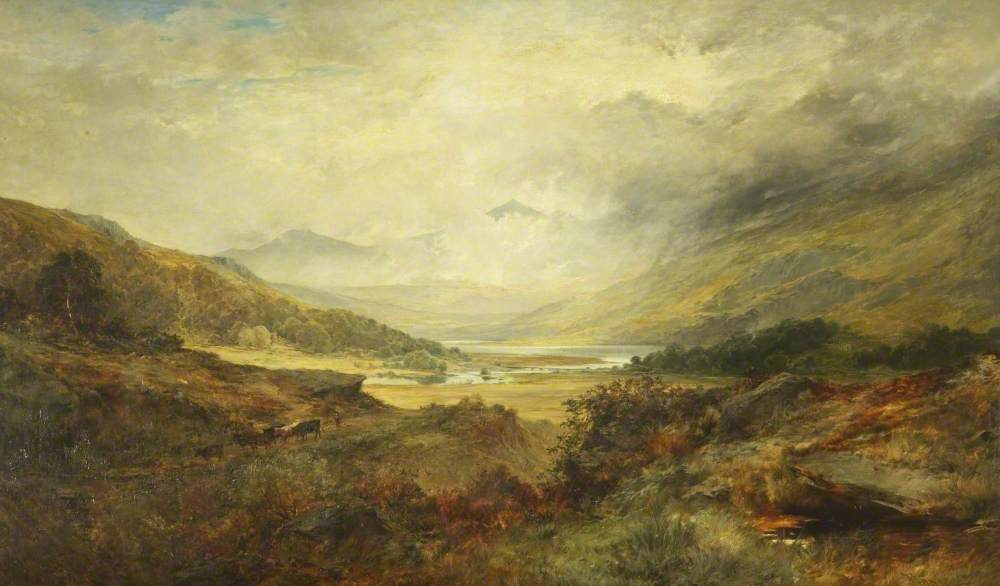
Snowdon from Capel Curig by John Finnie

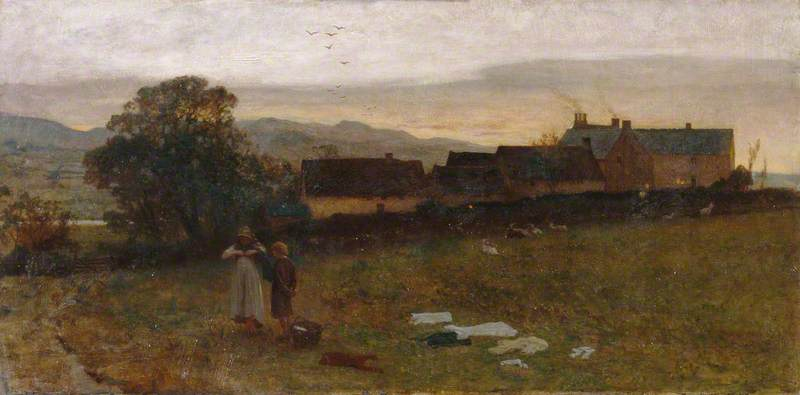
Landscape, Derbyshire by George Heming Mason

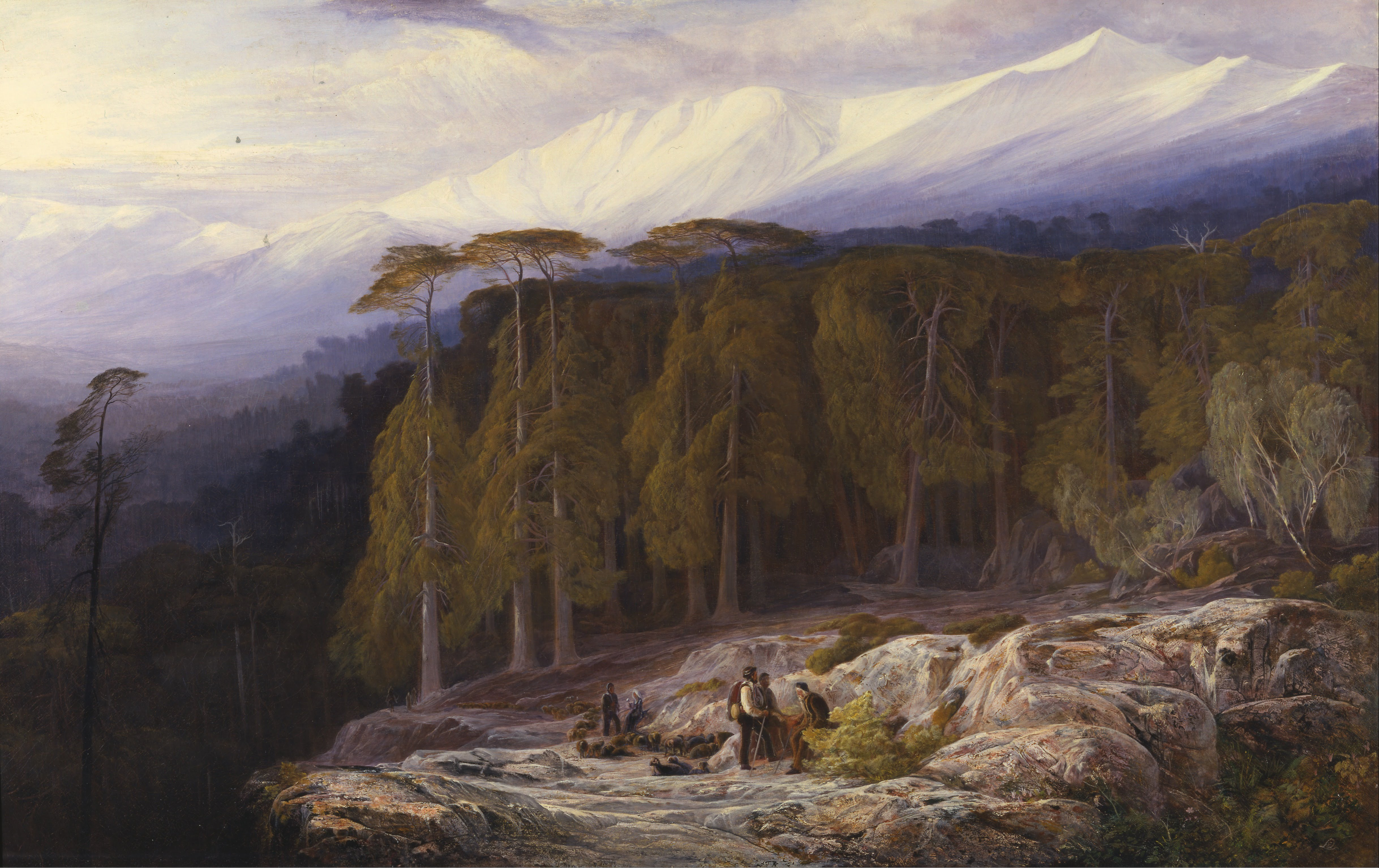
The Forest of Valdoniello, Corsica by Edward Lear

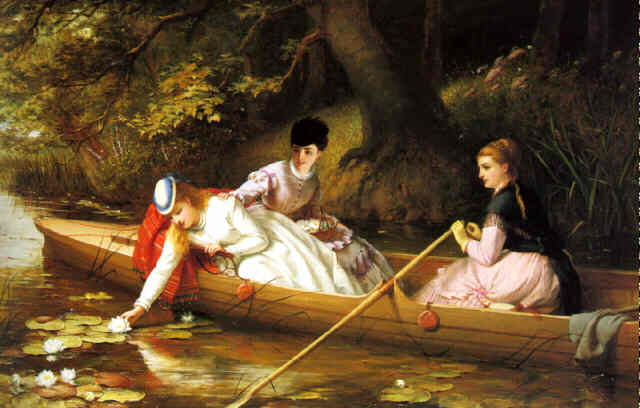
Thames Lilies by Thomas Brooks

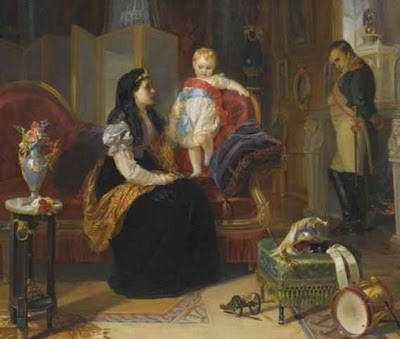
The First Interview of the Divorced Empress Josephine with the King of Rome by Henrietta Ward

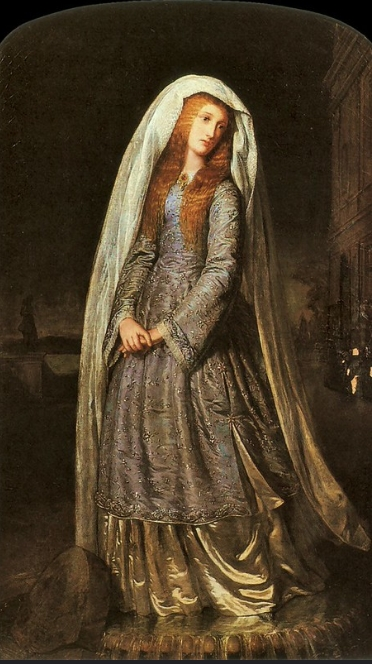
Undine by Louisa Starr

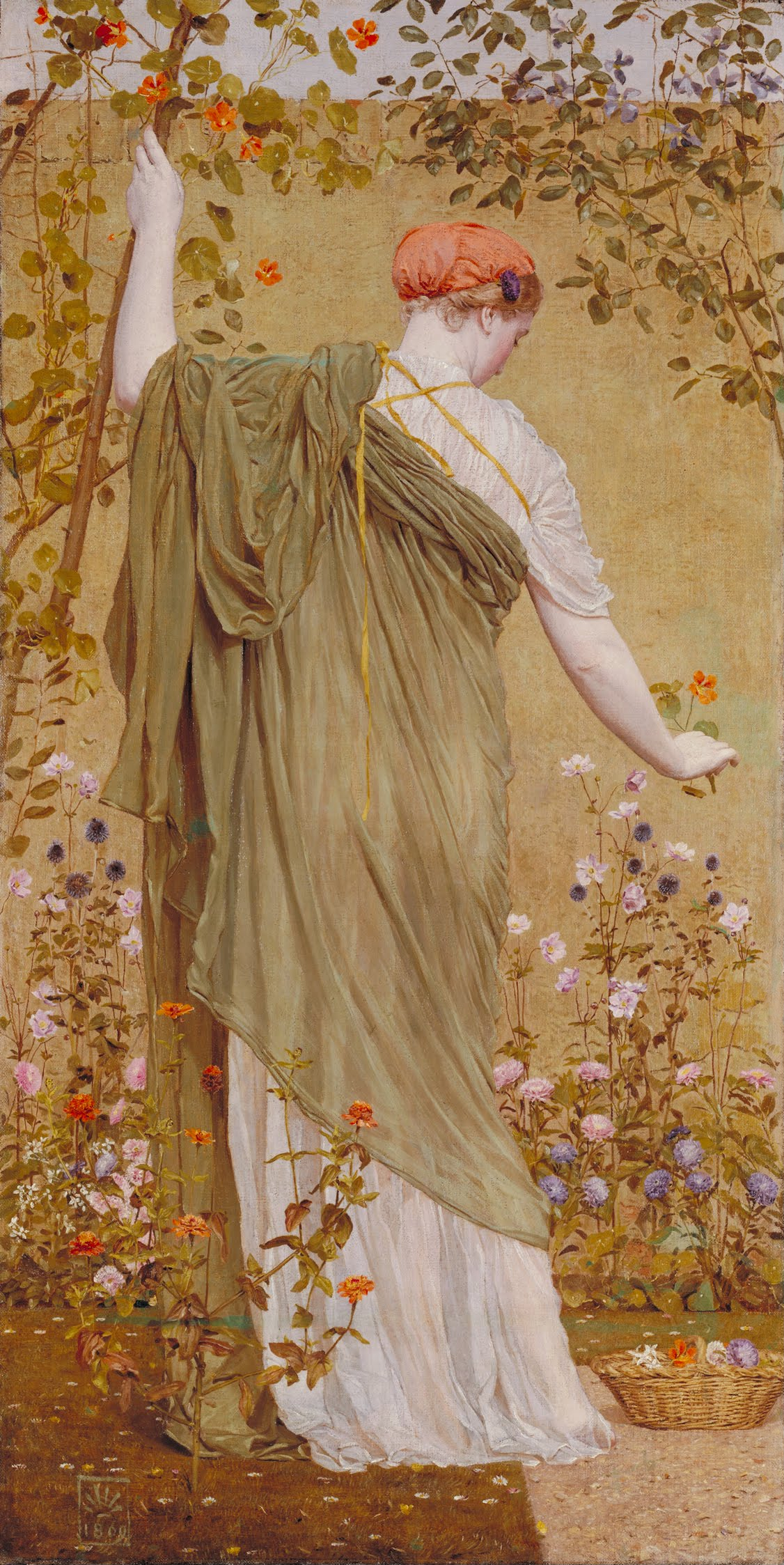
A Garden by Albert Joseph Moore

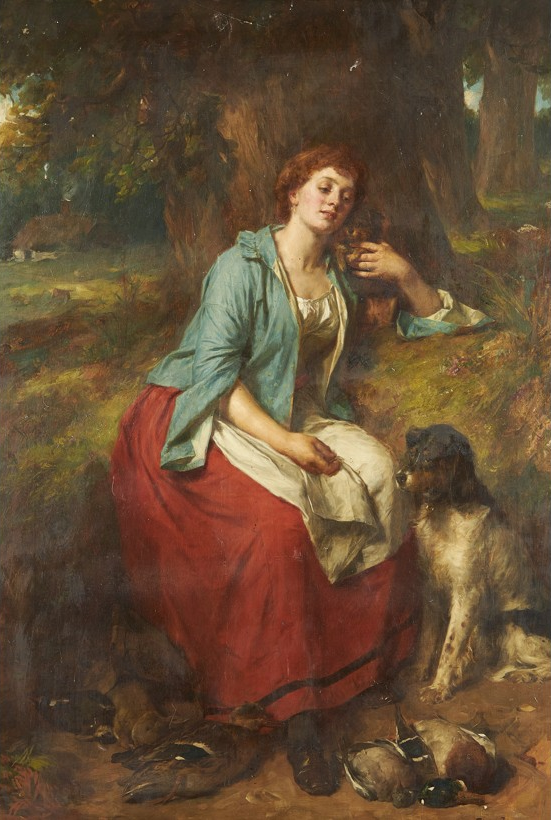
The Gamekeeper's Daughter by John Faed

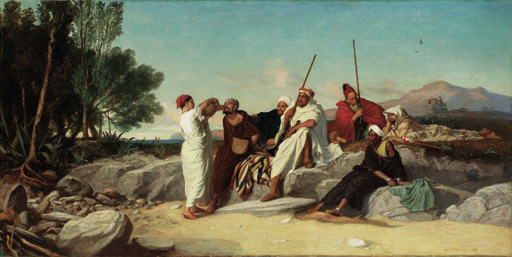
Arab Prisoners by John Evan Hodgson

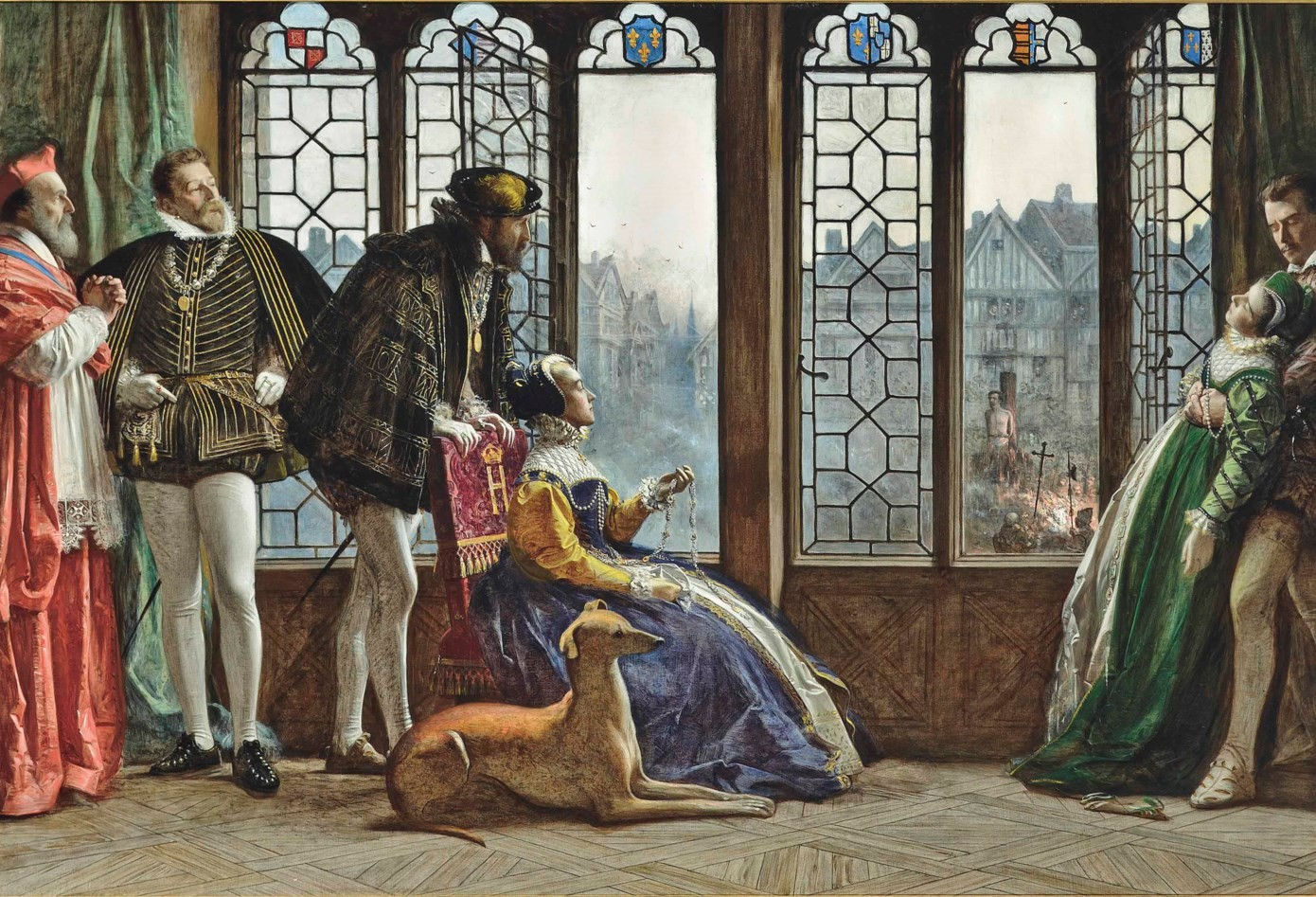
Henry II of France and Diana of Poitiers Witnessing the Execution of a Protestant by Alfred Holst Tourrier

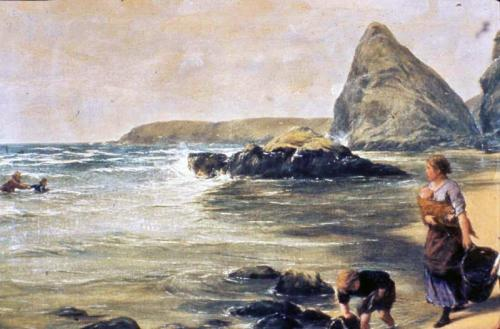
Sea Earnings by James Clarke Hook

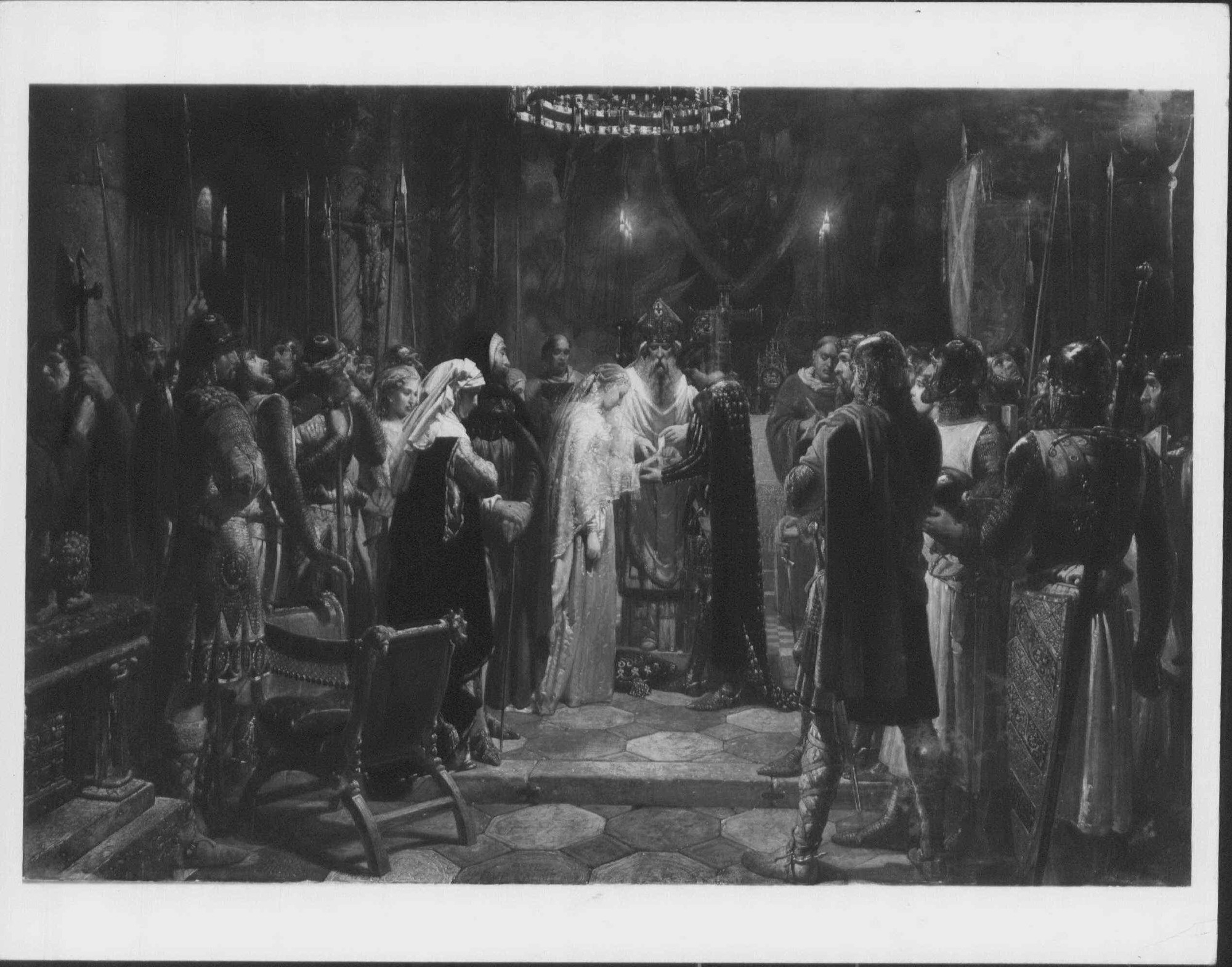
The Marriage of Sir Nigel Bruce and Agnes of Buchan by Edward Henry Corbould

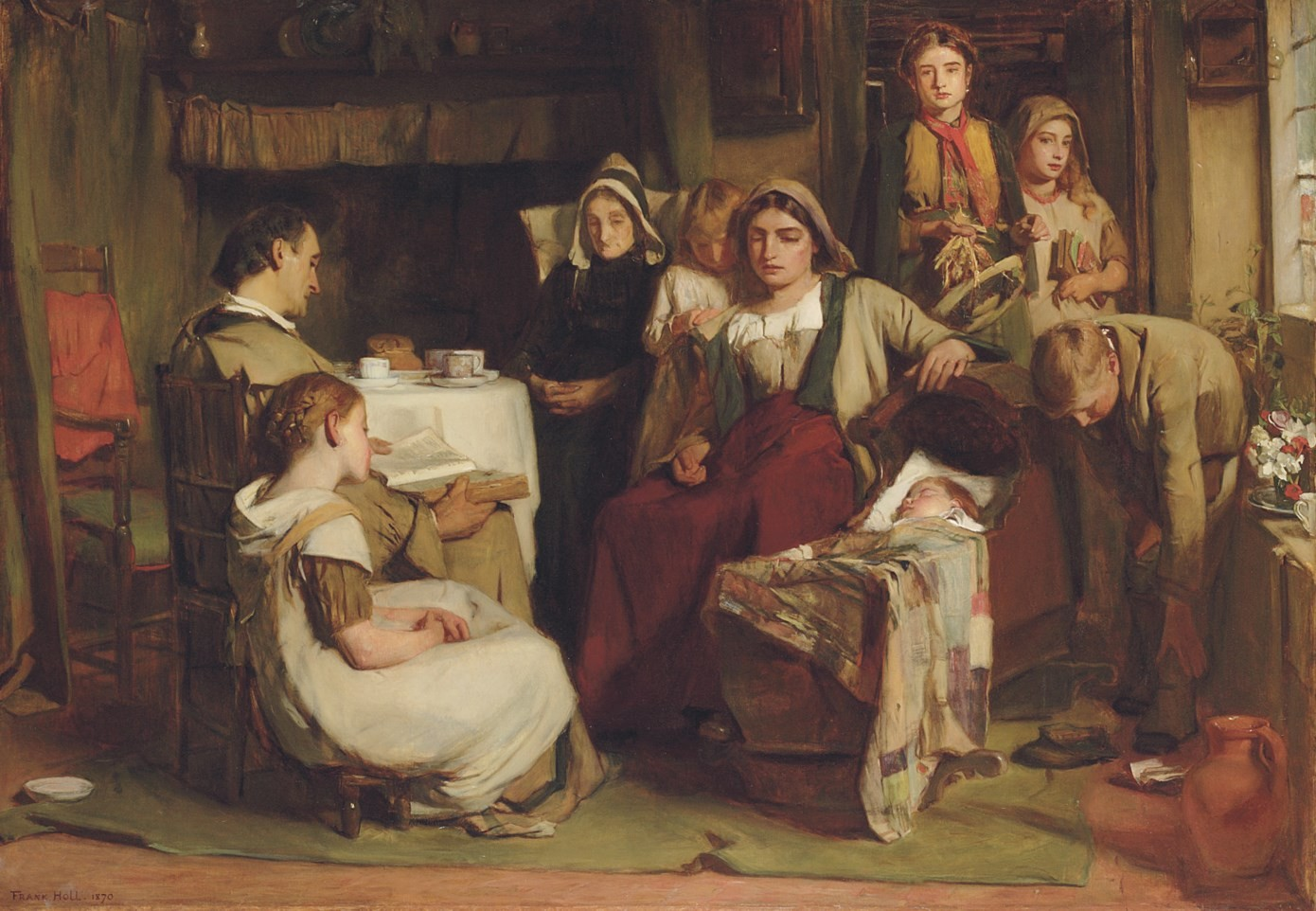
Better Is a Dinner of Herbs by Frank Holl

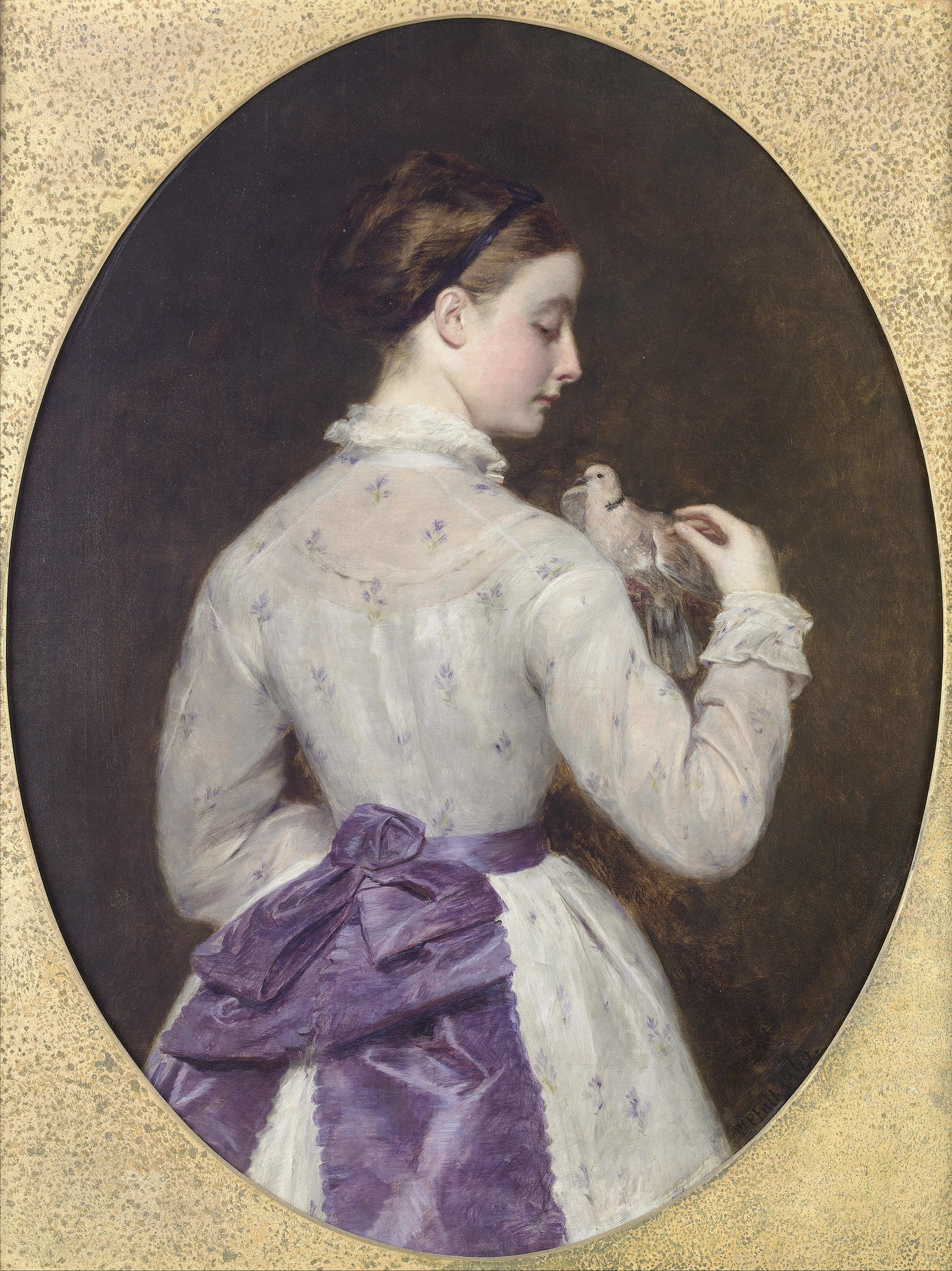
Two Doves by William Powell Frith

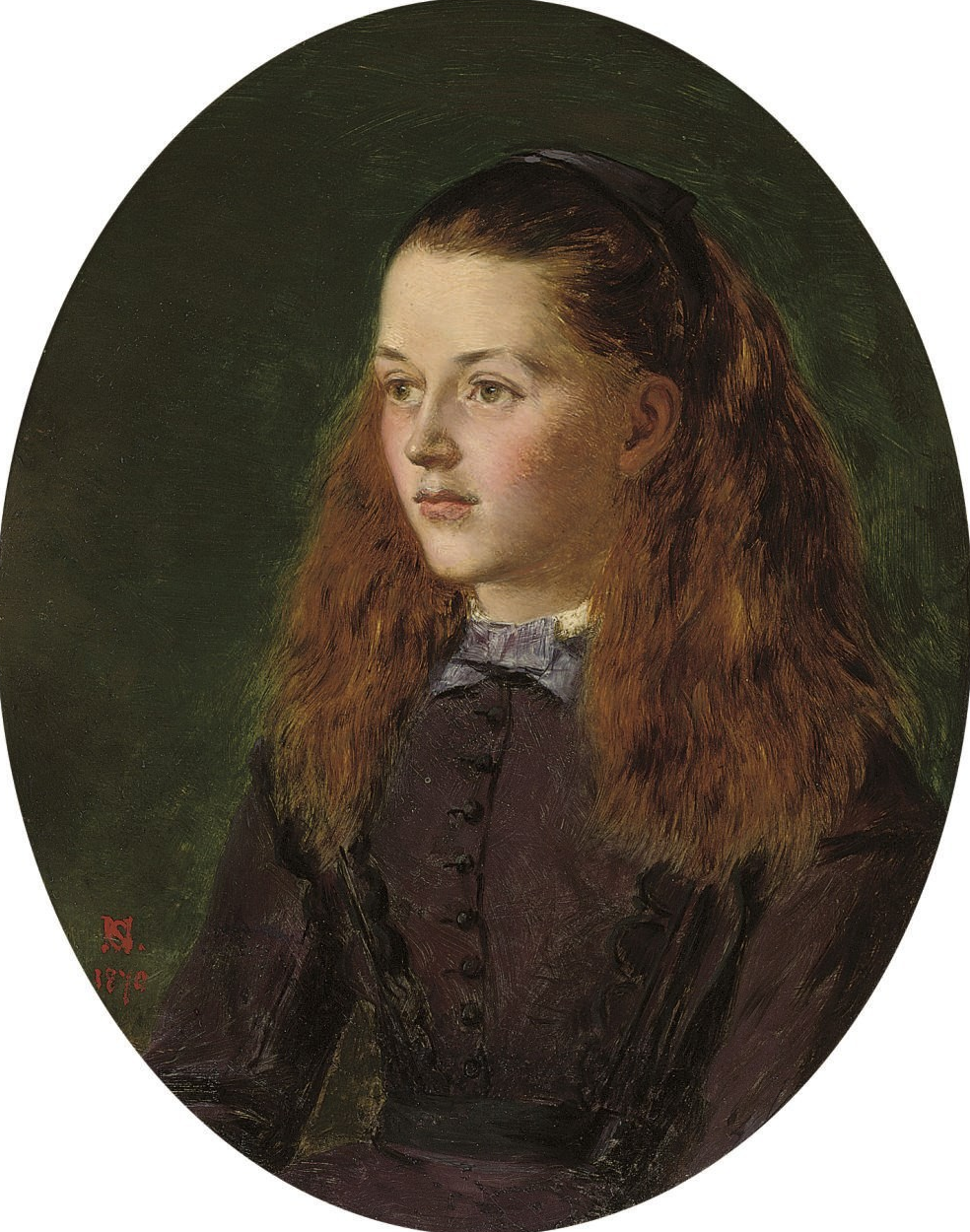
Portrait of Fanny Frith by Henry Nelson O'Neil

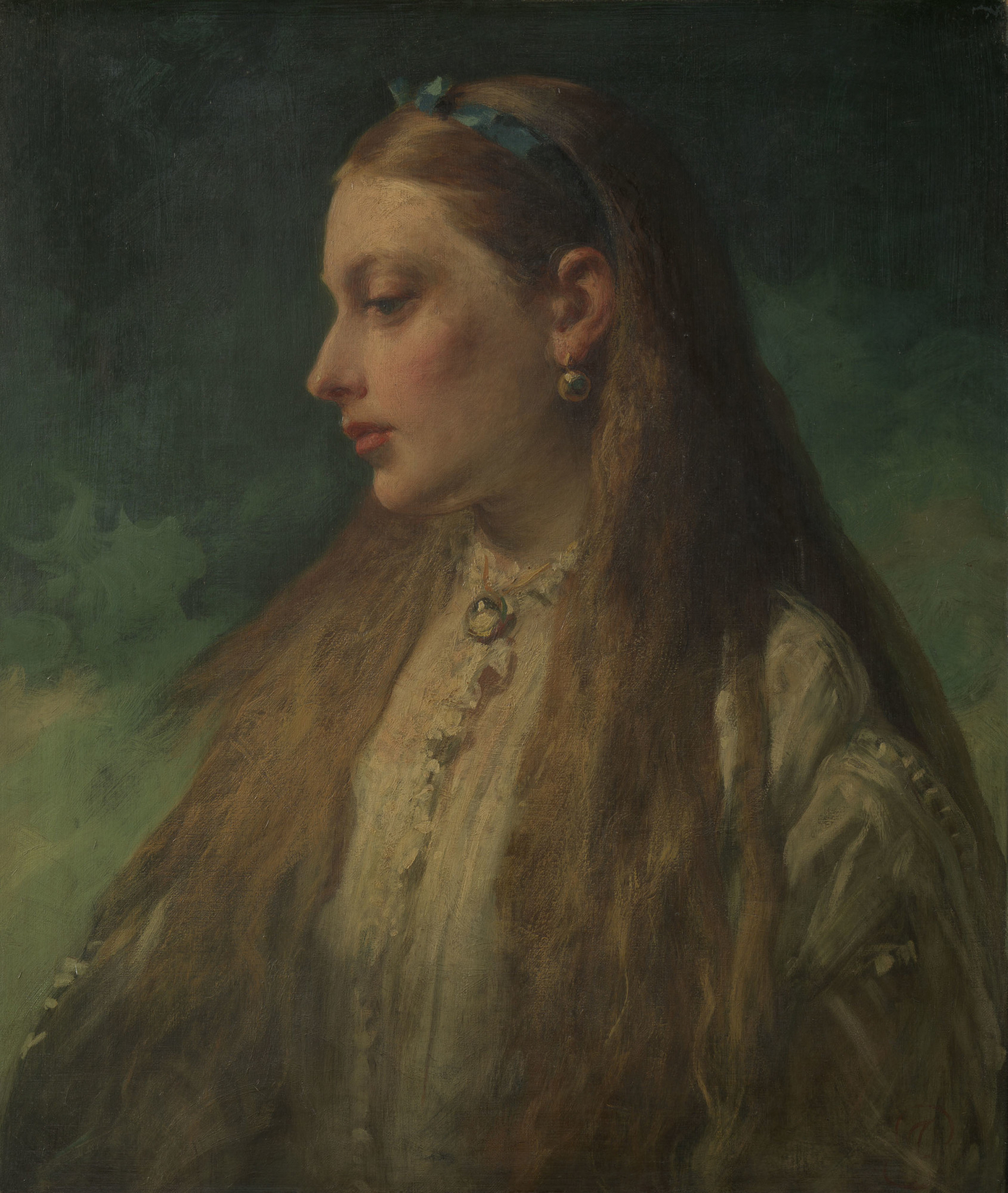
Portrait of Princess Beatrice by James Sant

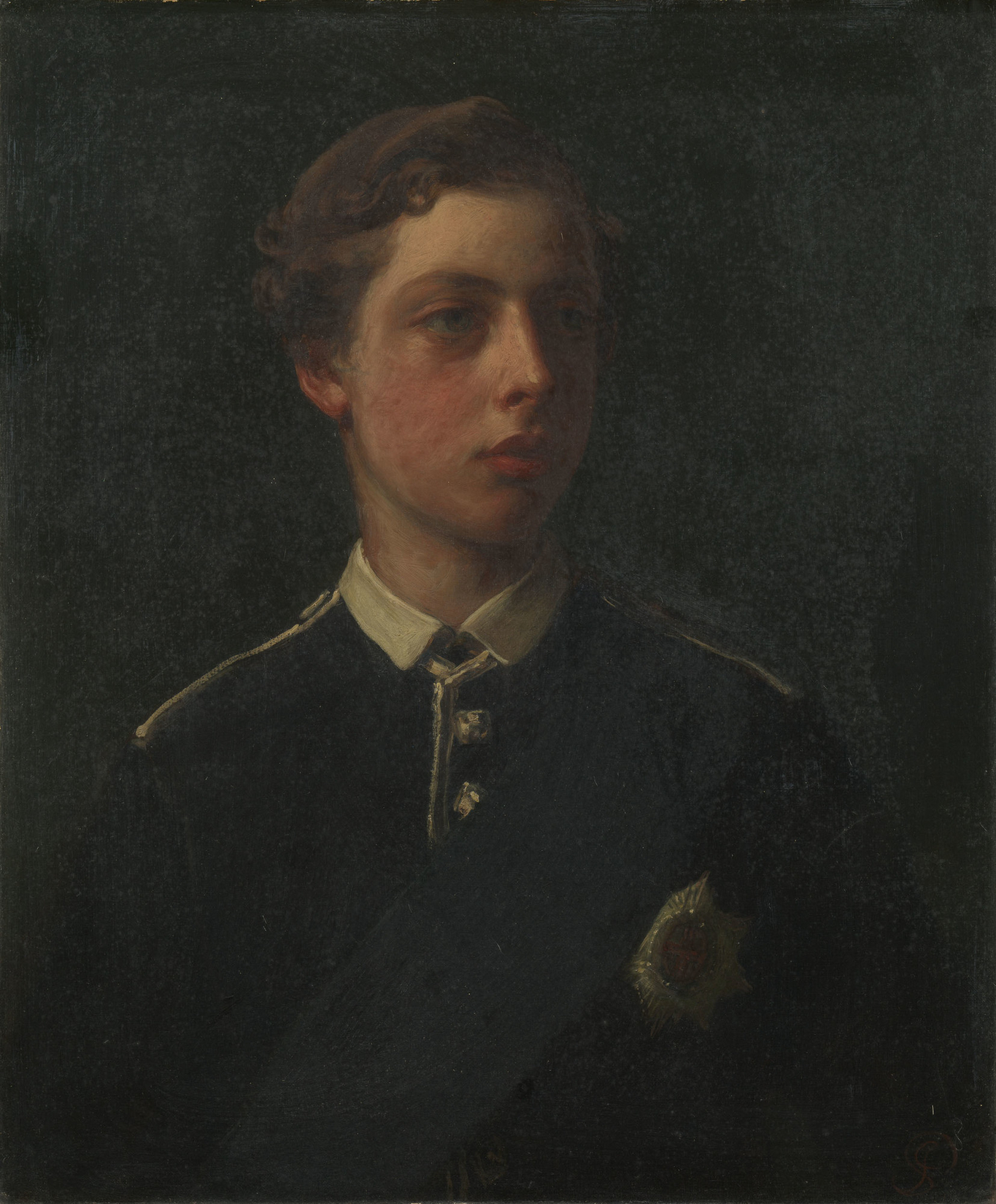
Portrait of Prince Leopold by James Sant

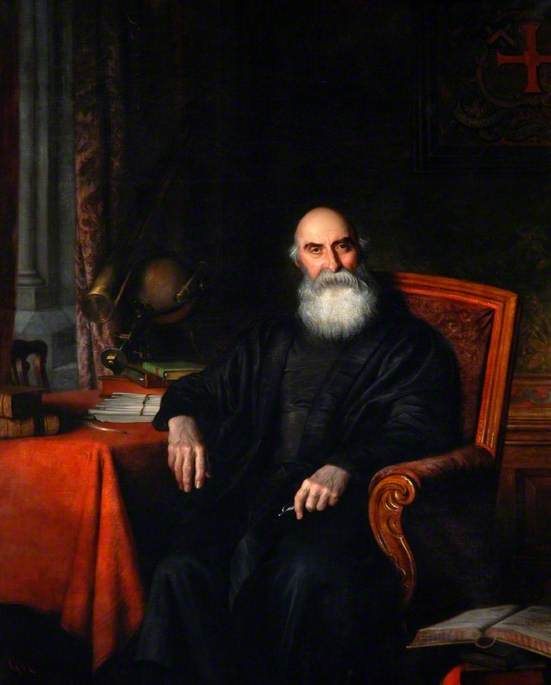
Portrait of Temple Chevallier by Charles West Cope

Portrait of Arthur Grote by John Prescott Knight

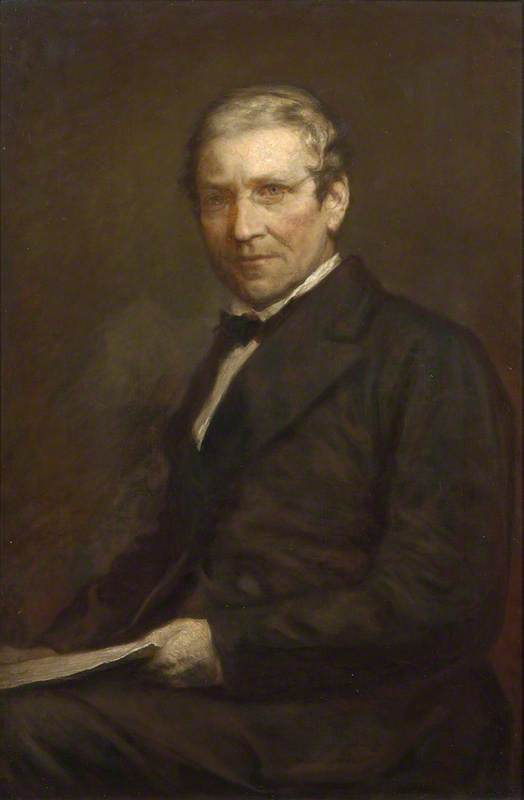
Portrait of Charles Wheatstone by Charles Martin

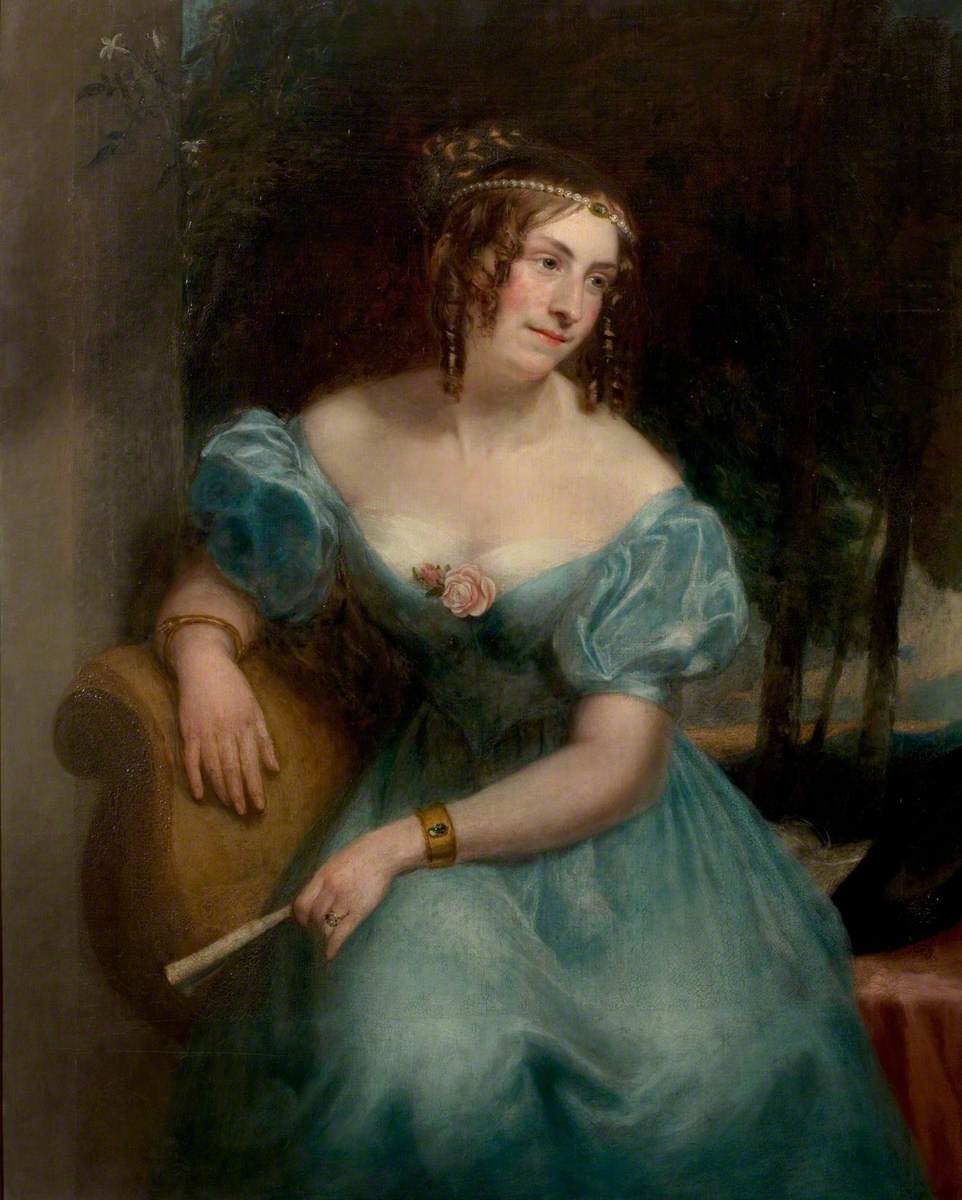
Portrait of Contessa Guiccioli by Henry William Pickersgill, begun in 1832

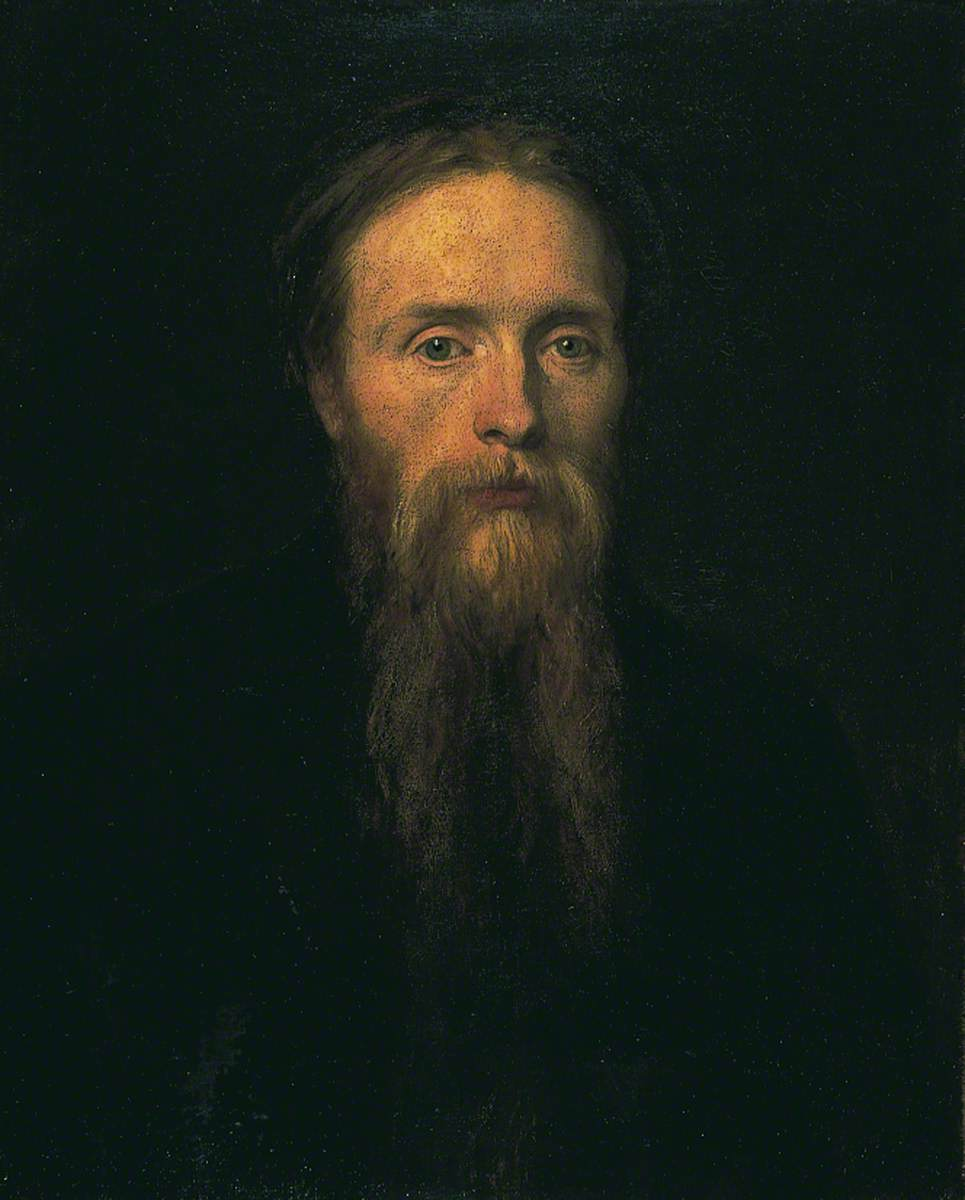
Portrait of Edward Burne-Jones by George Frederic Watts

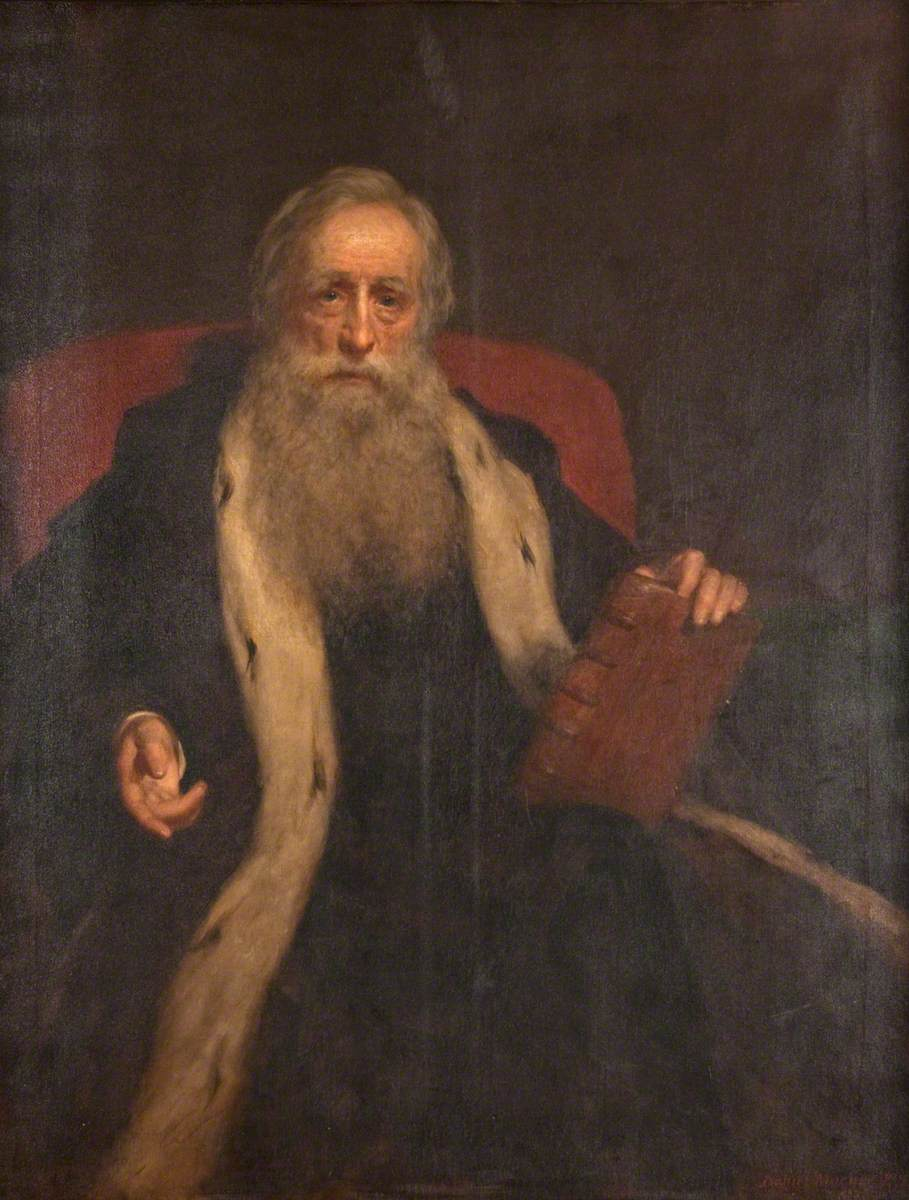
Portrait of Thomas Barclay by Daniel Macnee

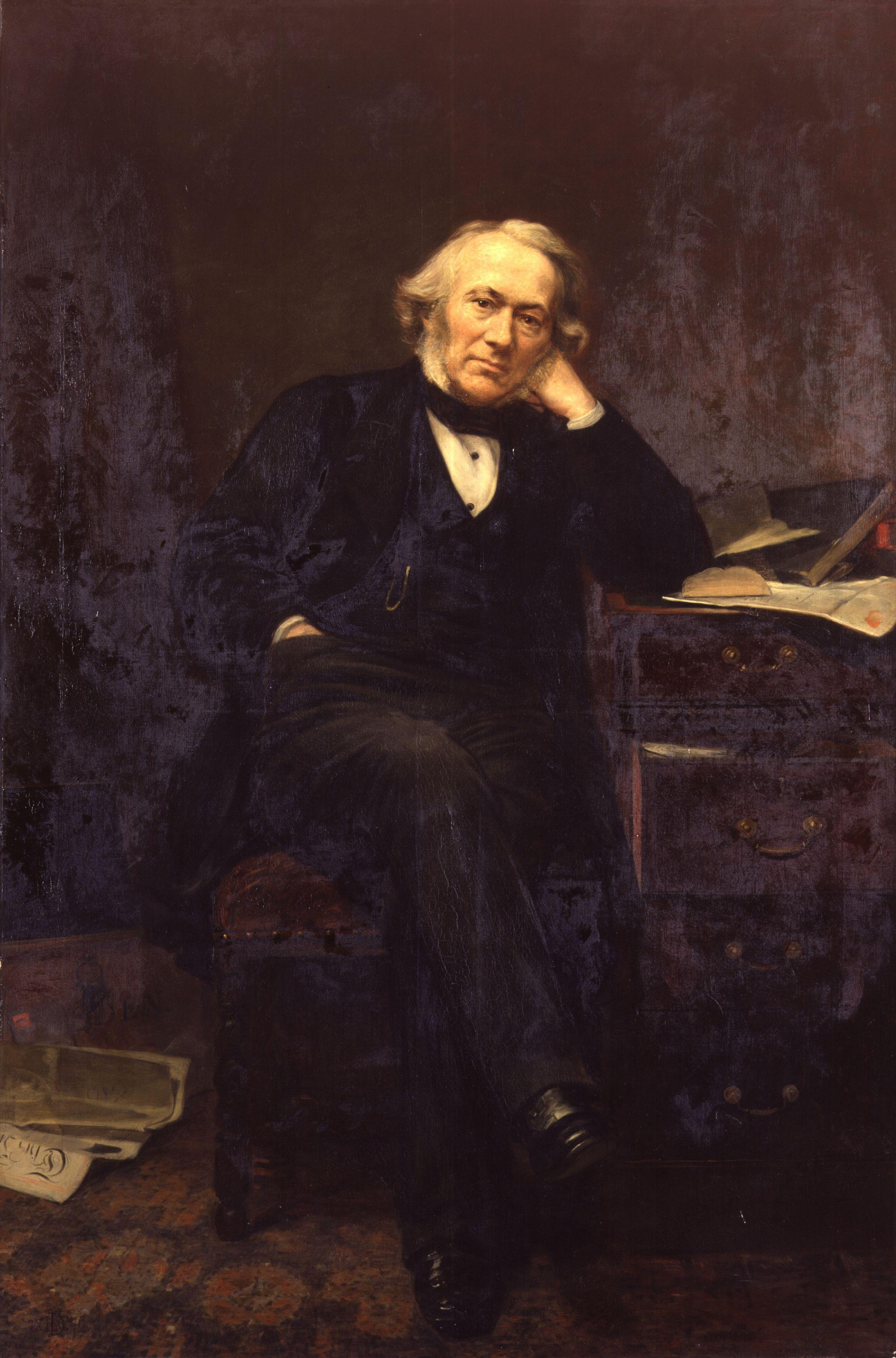
Portrait of Richard Cobden by Lowes Cato Dickinson

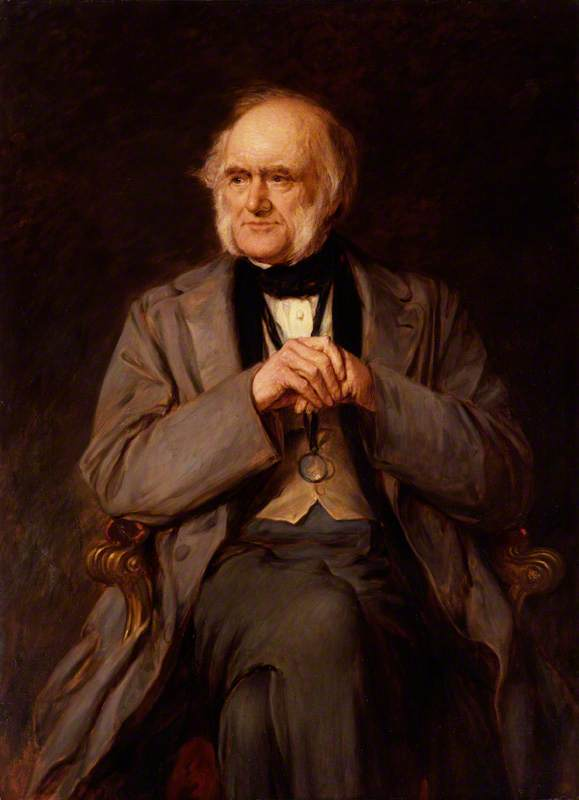
Portrait of Charles Lyell by Lowes Cato Dickinson

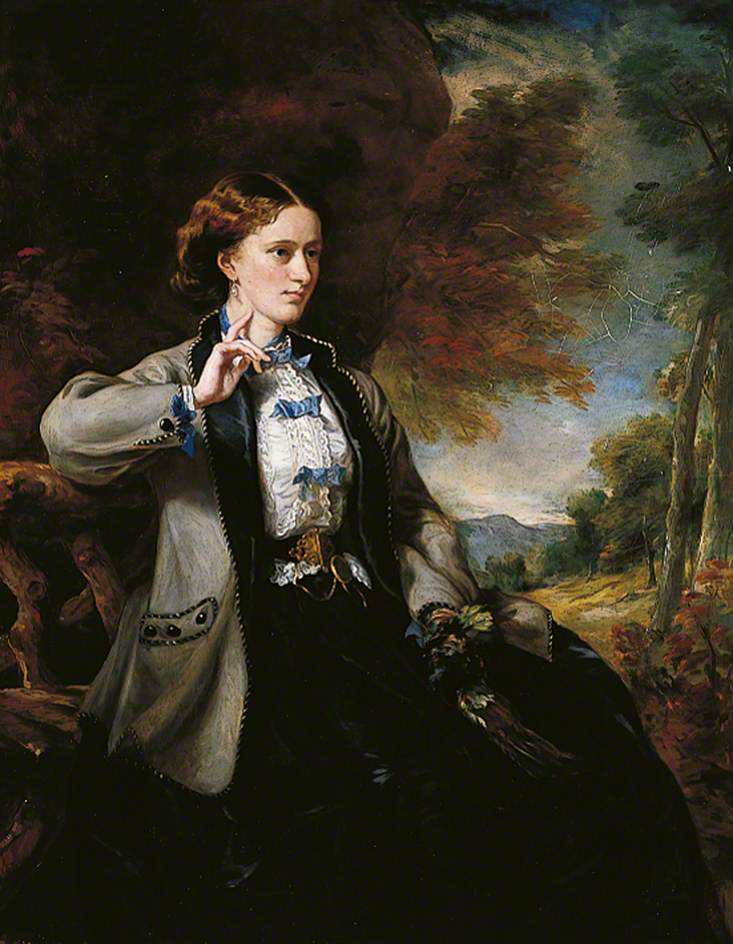
Portrait of Emily Meynell-Ingram by Francis Grant

== Bibliography ==
- Murray, Peter. Daniel Maclise, 1806-1870: Romancing the Past. Crawford Art Gallery, 2009.
- Smith, Alison. The Victorian Nude: Sexuality, Morality, and Art. Manchester University Press, 1996.
- Sutherland, Daniel E. Whistler: A Life for Art's Sake. Yale University Press 2014.
- Wilson, Keith (ed.) A Companion to Thomas Hardy. Wiley, 2012.
