= John Everett Millais =

British painter and illustrator (1829–1896)

Sir John Everett Millais Bt PRA
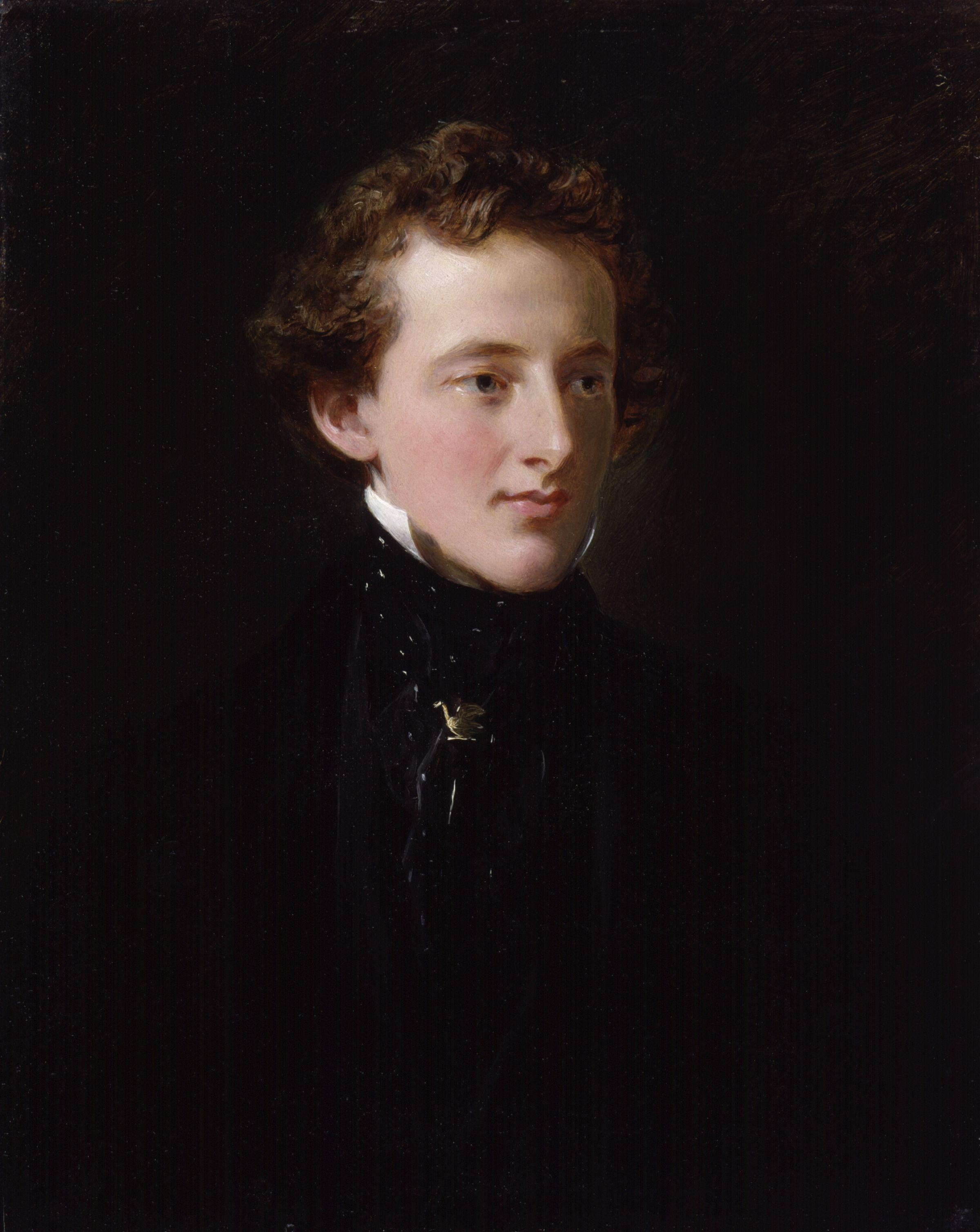
- Portrait of John Everett Millais by Charles Robert Leslie, 1852
- Born: 8 June 1829; Southampton, Hampshire, England
- Died: 13 August 1896 (aged 67); Kensington, London, England
- Education: Royal Academy of Art
- Known for: Painting, drawing, printmaking
- Notable work: Ophelia; Christ in the House of His Parents
- Movement: Pre-Raphaelite Brotherhood
- Spouse: Euphemia Gray (m. 1855)
- Children: 8, including John Guille Millais

Sir John Everett Millais, 1st Baronet (/ˈmɪleɪ/ MIL-ay; 8 June 1829 – 13 August 1896) was an English painter and illustrator who was one of the founders of the Pre-Raphaelite Brotherhood. He was a child prodigy who, aged eleven, became the youngest student to enter the Royal Academy Schools. The Pre-Raphaelite Brotherhood was founded at his family home in London, at 83 Gower Street (now number 7). Millais became the most famous exponent of the style, his painting Christ in the House of His Parents (1849–50) generating considerable controversy, and he produced a picture that could serve as the embodiment of the historical and naturalist focus of the group, Ophelia, in 1851–1852.

By the mid-1850s, Millais was moving away from the Pre-Raphaelite style to develop a new form of realism in his art. His later works were enormously successful, making Millais one of the wealthiest artists of his day, but some former admirers including William Morris saw this as a sell-out (Millais notoriously allowed one of his paintings to be used for a sentimental soap advertisement). While these and early 20th-century critics, reading art through the lens of Modernism, viewed much of his later production as wanting, this perspective has changed in recent decades, as his later works have come to be seen in the context of wider changes and advanced tendencies in the broader late nineteenth-century art world, and can now be seen as predictive of the art world of the present.

Millais's personal life has also played a significant role in his reputation. His wife Effie was formerly married to the critic John Ruskin, who had supported Millais's early work. The annulment of the Ruskin marriage and Effie's subsequent marriage to Millais have sometimes been linked to his change of style. She also became a powerful promoter of his work and they worked in concert to secure commissions and expand their social and intellectual circles.

== Early life ==
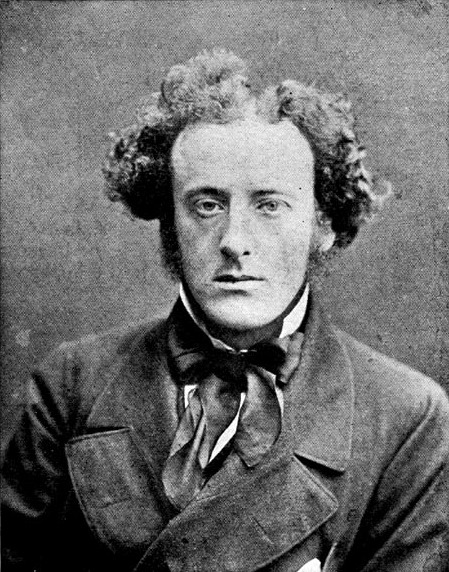
Photo of Millais, c. 1854

Millais was born in Southampton, England, in 1829, of a prominent Jersey-based family. His parents were John William Millais and Emily Mary Millais (née Evermy). Most of his early childhood was spent in Jersey, to which he retained a strong devotion throughout his life. The author Thackeray once asked him "when England conquered Jersey". Millais replied "Never! Jersey conquered England." The family moved to Dinan in Brittany for a few years in his childhood.

His mother's "forceful personality" was the most powerful influence on his early life. She had a keen interest in art and music, and encouraged her son's artistic bent, promoting the relocating of the family to London to help develop contacts at the Royal Academy of Art. He later said "I owe everything to my mother."

In 1840, his artistic talent won him a place at the Royal Academy Schools at the still unprecedented age of eleven. While there, he met William Holman Hunt and Dante Gabriel Rossetti with whom he formed the Pre-Raphaelite Brotherhood (known as the "PRB") in September 1847 in his family home on Gower Street, off Bedford Square.

== Pre-Raphaelite works ==
Millais's Christ in the House of His Parents (1849–50) was highly controversial because of its realistic portrayal of a working class Holy Family labouring in a messy carpentry workshop. Later works were also controversial, though less so. Millais achieved popular success with A Huguenot (1851–52), which depicts a young couple about to be separated because of religious conflicts. He repeated this theme in many later works. All these early works were painted with great attention to detail, often concentrating on the beauty and complexity of the natural world.

In paintings such as Ophelia (1851–52) Millais created dense and elaborate pictorial surfaces based on the integration of naturalistic elements. This approach has been described as a kind of "pictorial eco-system". Mariana is a painting that Millais painted in 1850–51 based on the play Measure for Measure by William Shakespeare and the poem of the same name by Alfred, Lord Tennyson, from 1830. In the play, the young Mariana was to be married, but was rejected by her betrothed when her dowry was lost in a shipwreck.

This style was promoted by the critic John Ruskin, who had defended the Pre-Raphaelites against their critics. Millais's friendship with Ruskin introduced him to Ruskin's wife Effie.

Soon after they met, she modelled for his painting The Order of Release. As Millais painted Effie, they fell in love. Despite having been married to Ruskin for several years, Effie was still a virgin. Her parents realised something was wrong and she filed for an annulment.

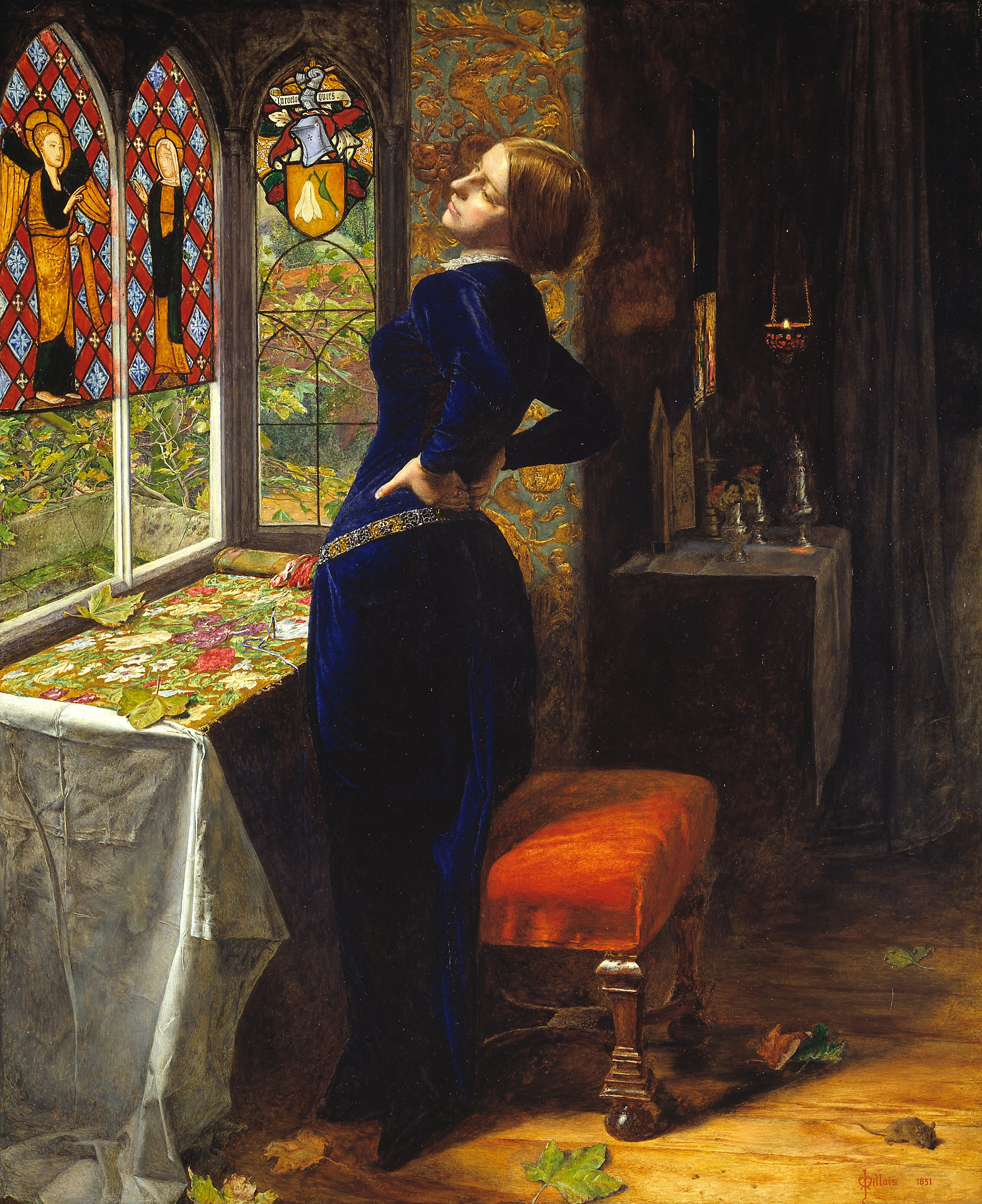
Mariana, 1851

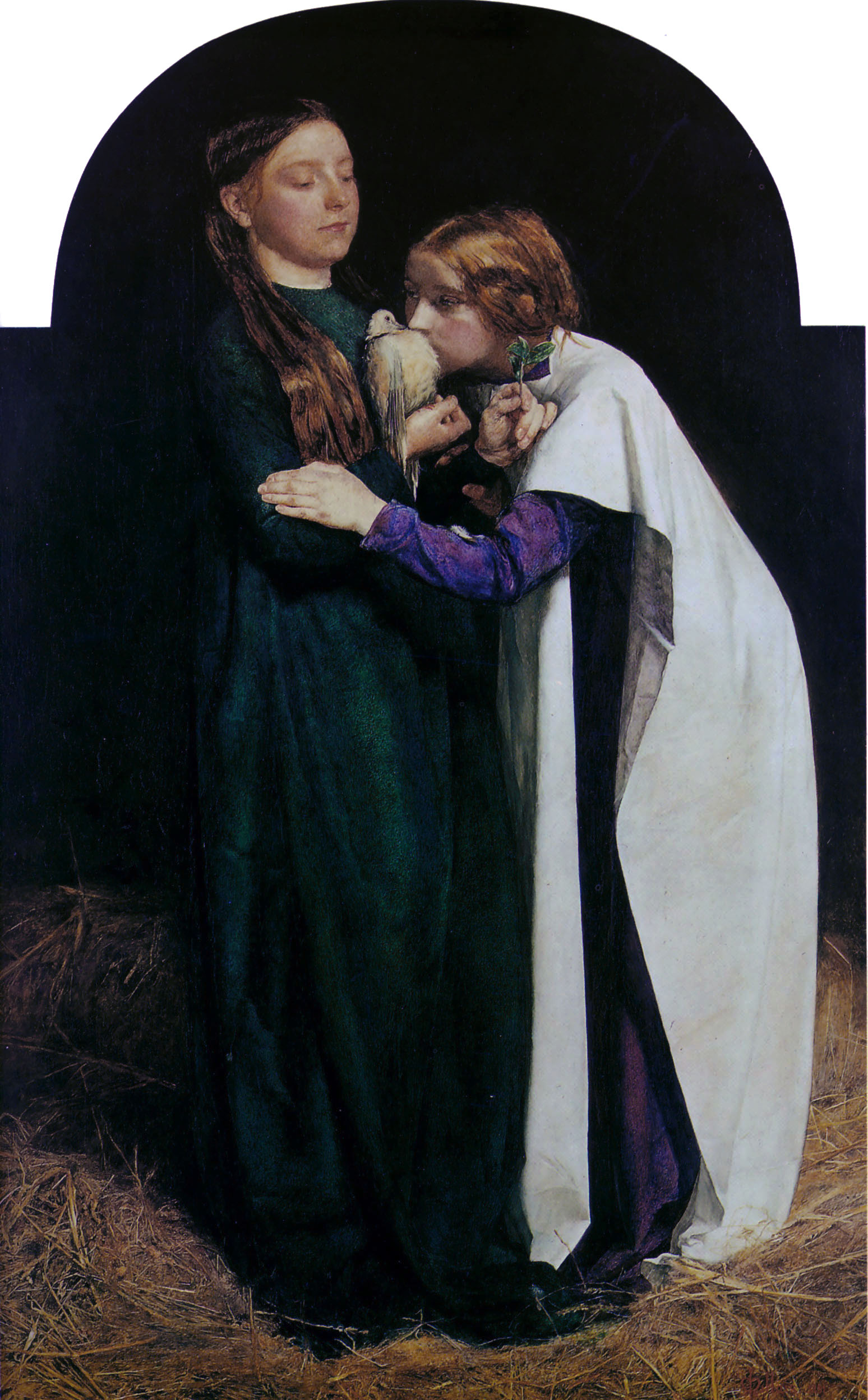
The Return of the Dove to the Ark (1851)
Ashmolean Museum, Oxford

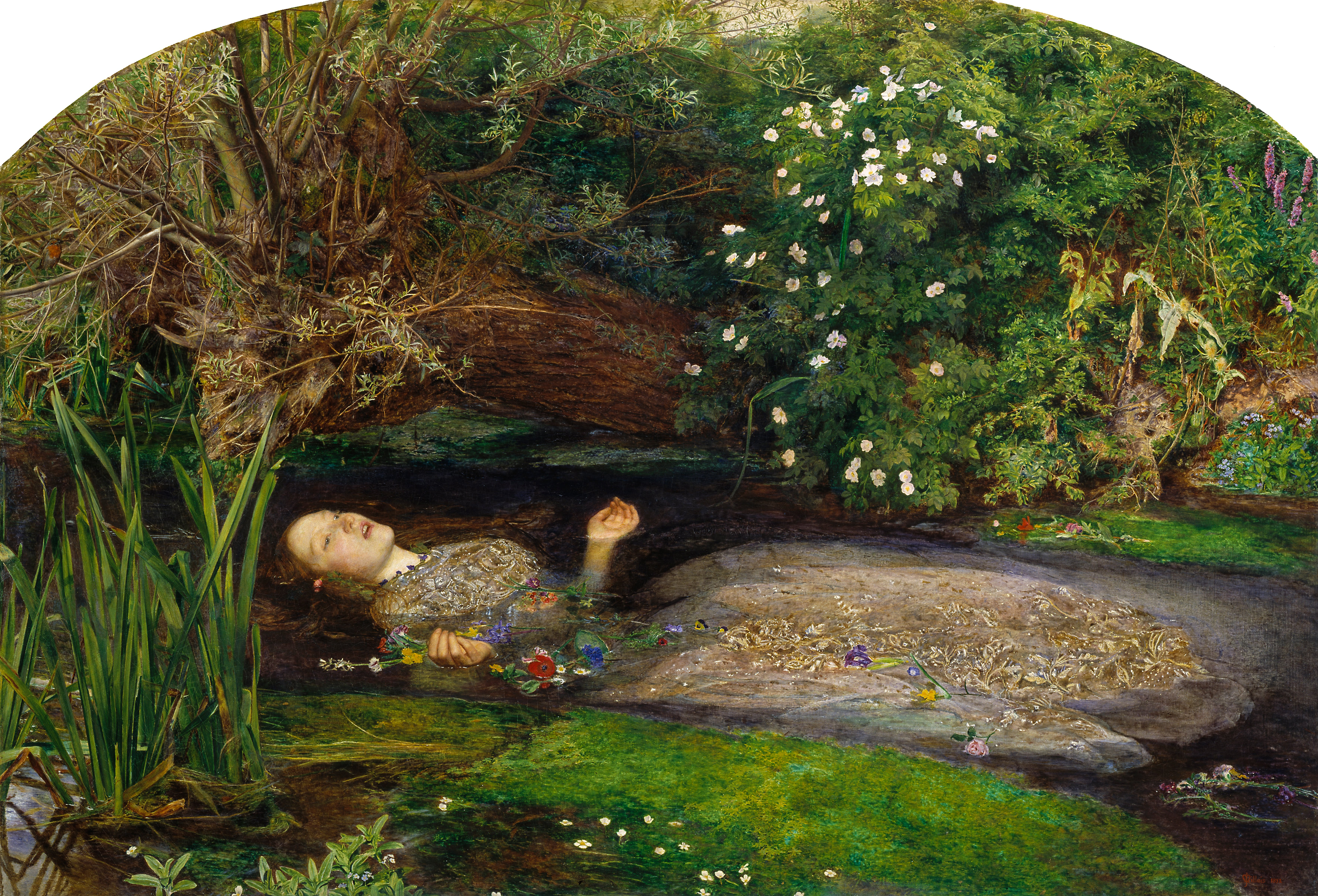
Ophelia (1851–52) Tate Britain, London

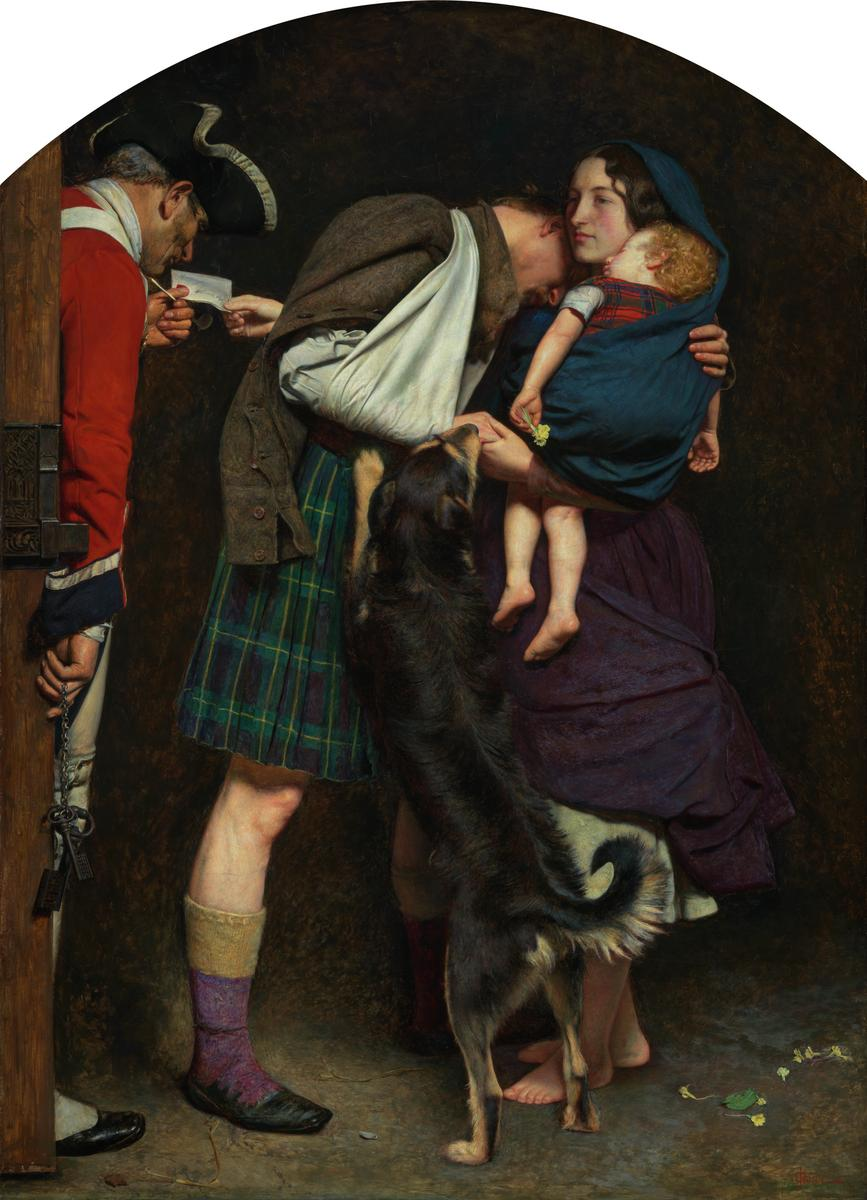
The Order of Release (1852–53) Tate Britain, London

=== Family ===
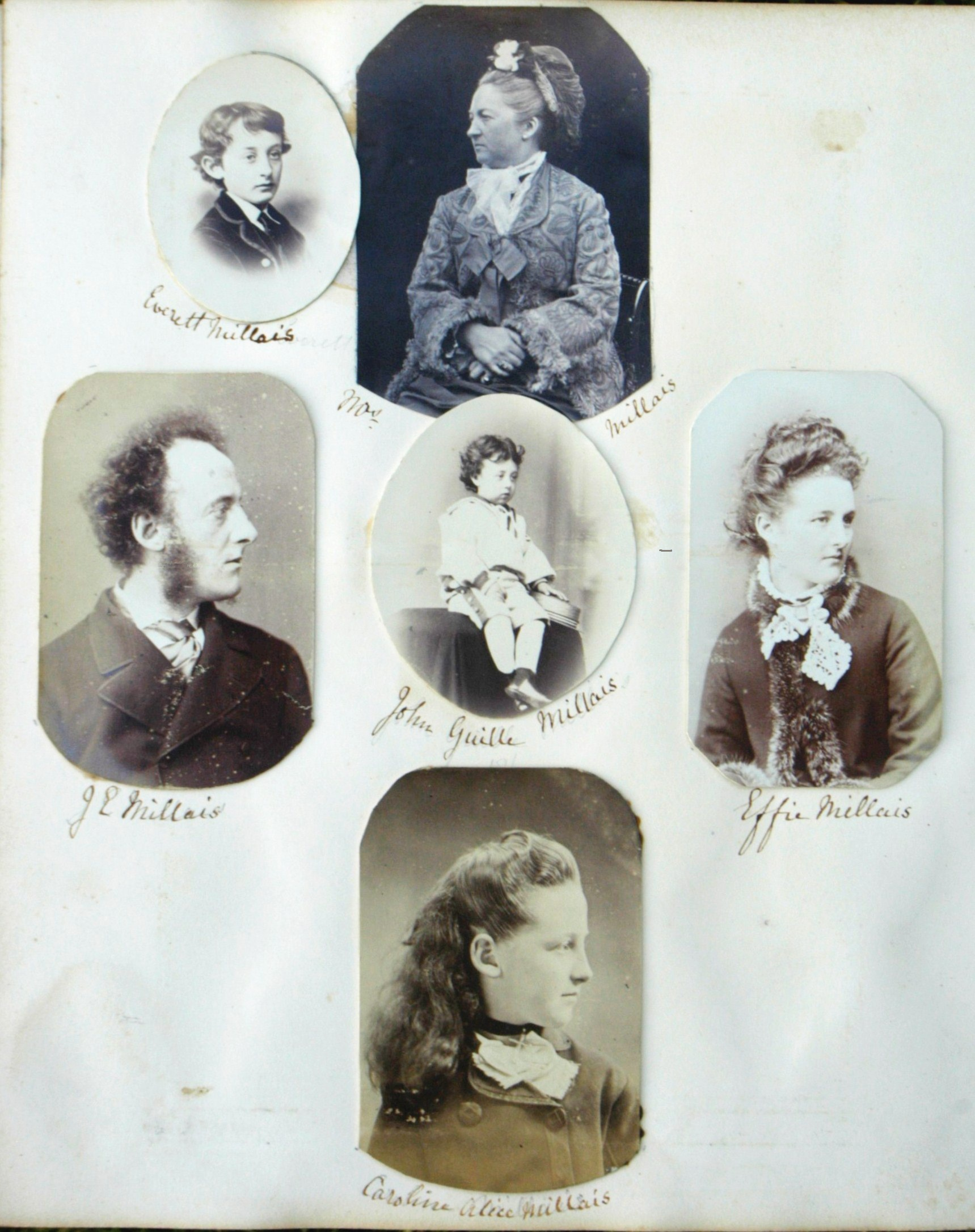
Photo assemblage of Millais's family c. 1870. Names in full size image.

In 1855, after her marriage to Ruskin was annulled, Effie and John Millais married. He and Effie eventually had eight children: Everett, born in 1856; George, born in 1857; Effie, born in 1858; Mary, born in 1860; Alice, born in 1862; Geoffroy, born in 1863; John in 1865; and Sophie in 1868. Their youngest son, John Guille Millais, became a naturalist, wildlife artist, and Millais's posthumous biographer. Their daughter Alice (1862–1936), later Alice Stuart-Worsley after she married Charles Stuart-Worsley, was a close friend and muse of the composer Edward Elgar, and is thought to have been an inspiration for themes in his Violin Concerto.

Effie's younger sister Sophie Gray sat for several pictures by Millais, prompting some speculation about the nature of their apparently fond relationship.

=== Later works ===
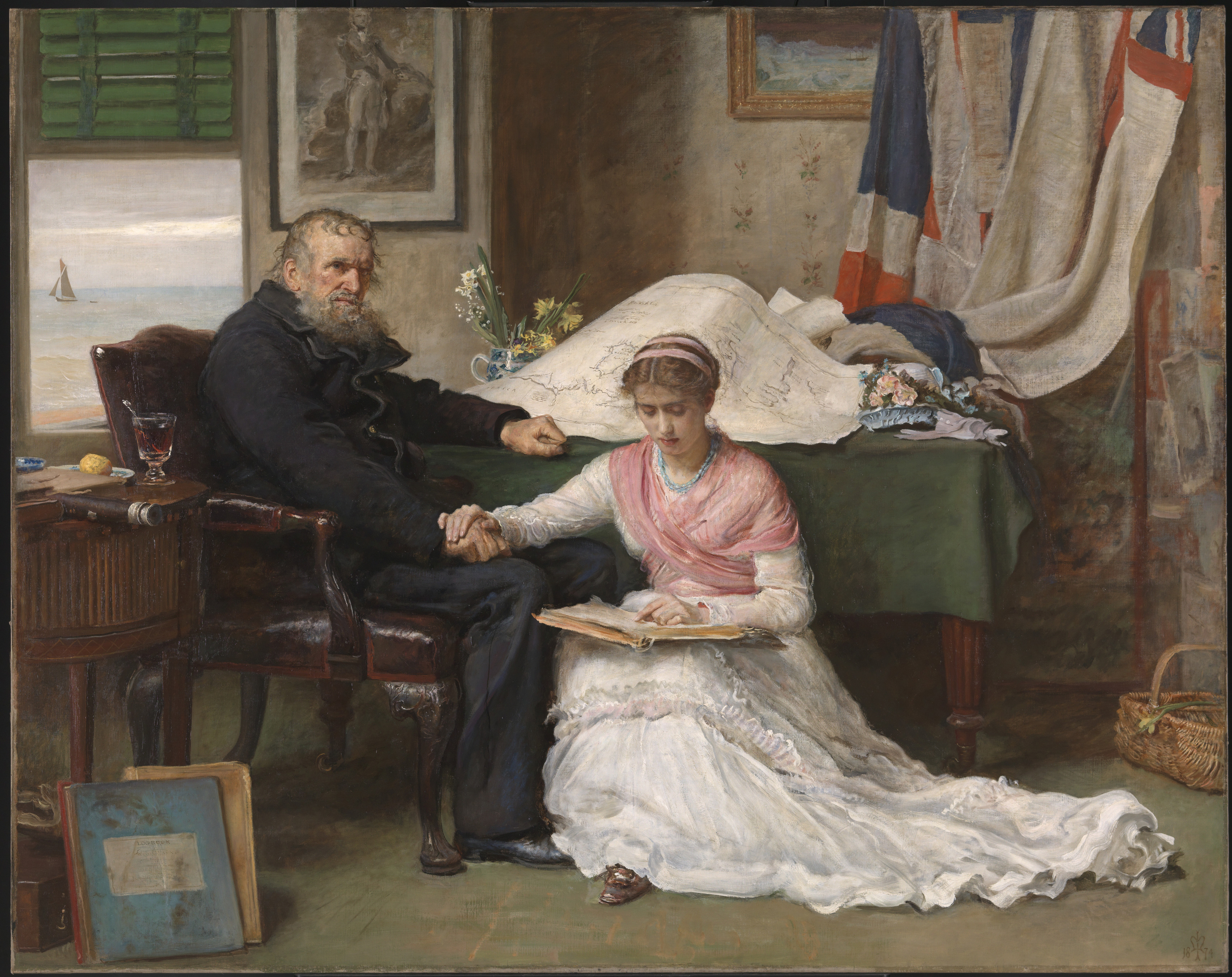
The North-West Passage (1874) Tate Britain, London

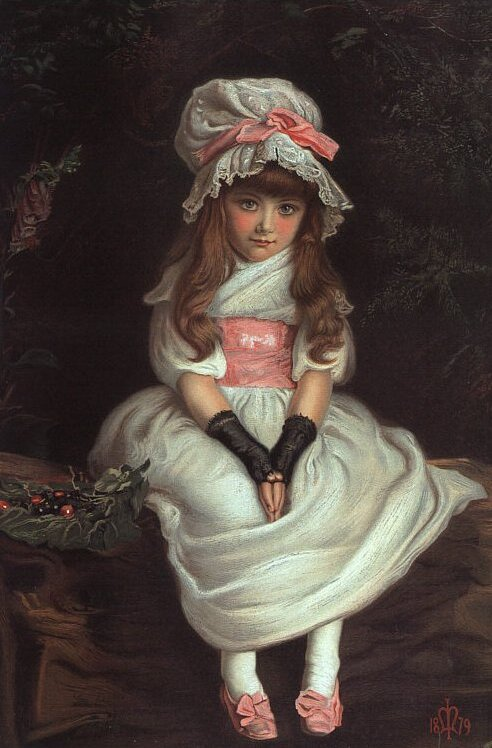
Cherry Ripe (1879), Private Collection

After his marriage, Millais began to paint in a broader style, which was condemned by Ruskin as "a catastrophe". It has been argued that this change of style resulted from Millais's need to increase his output to support his growing family. Unsympathetic critics such as William Morris accused him of "selling out" to achieve popularity and wealth. His admirers, in contrast, pointed to the artist's connections with Whistler and Albert Moore, and influence on John Singer Sargent. Millais himself argued that as he grew more confident as an artist, he could paint with greater boldness. In his article "Thoughts on our Art of Today" (1888), he recommended Velázquez and Rembrandt as models for artists to follow. Paintings such as The Eve of St. Agnes and The Somnambulist clearly show an ongoing dialogue between the artist and Whistler, whose work Millais strongly supported. Other paintings of the late 1850s and 1860s can be interpreted as anticipating aspects of the Aesthetic Movement. Many deploy broad blocks of harmoniously arranged colour and are symbolic rather than narratival. From 1862, the Millais family lived at 7 Cromwell Place, Kensington, London.

Later works, from the 1870s onwards demonstrate Millais's reverence for Old Masters such as Joshua Reynolds and Velázquez. Many of these paintings were on an historical theme. Notable among these are The Two Princes Edward and Richard in the Tower (1878) depicting the Princes in the Tower, The Northwest Passage (1874) and The Boyhood of Raleigh (1871). Such paintings indicate Millais's interest in subjects connected to Britain's history and expanding empire. Millais also achieved great popularity with his paintings of children, notably Bubbles (1886) – famous, or perhaps notorious, for being used in the advertising of Pears soap – and Cherry Ripe. Three red-haired young girls who modelled as Scottish peasant girls in his painting An Idyll of 1745, were Hetty, Lily and Rose Pettigrew from Portsmouth in their first modelling roles, who became well-known models in late nineteen century London. His last project (1896) was to be a painting entitled "The Last Trek". Based on his illustration for his son's book, it depicted a hunter lying dead in the veldt, his body contemplated by two onlookers.

== Landscapes 1870–1892 ==
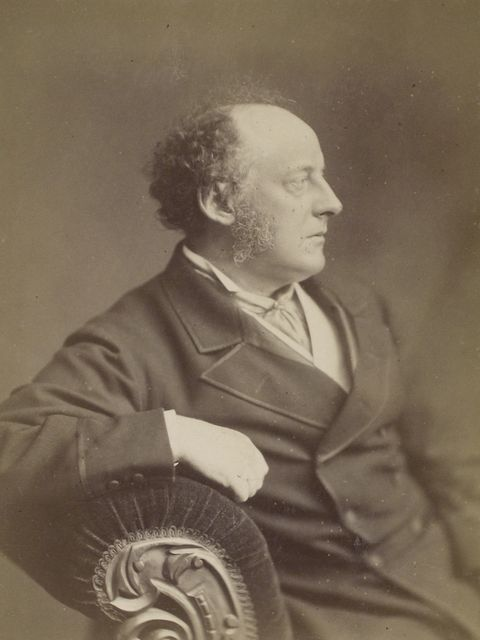
Millais later in his career

His many landscape paintings of this period usually depict difficult or dangerous terrain. The first of these, Chill October (1870, Collection of Andrew Lloyd Webber), was painted in Perth, near his wife's family home. It was the first of the large-scale Scottish landscapes Millais painted periodically throughout his later career. Usually autumnal and often bleakly unpicturesque, they evoke a mood of melancholy and sense of transience that recalls his cycle-of-nature paintings of the later 1850s, especially Autumn Leaves (Manchester Art Gallery) and The Vale of Rest (Tate Britain), though with little or no direct symbolism or human activity to point to their meaning.

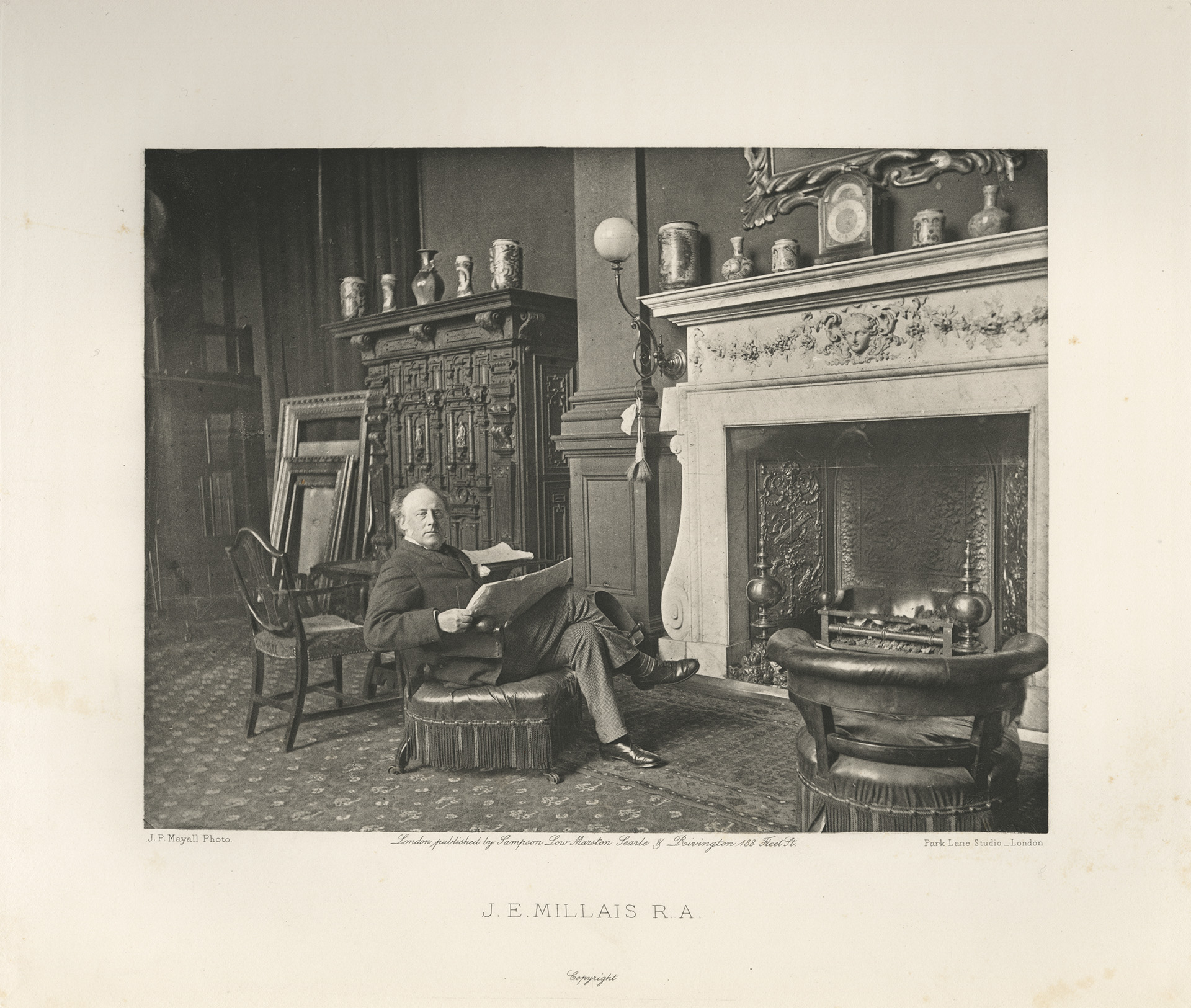
John Everett Millais by J. P. Mayall from Artists at Home, photogravure, published 1884, Department of Image Collections, National Gallery of Art Library, Washington, DC

In 1870 Millais returned to full landscape pictures, and over the next twenty years painted a number of scenes of Perthshire where he was annually found hunting and fishing from August until late into the autumn each year. Most of these landscapes are autumnal or early winter in season and show bleak, dank, water-fringed bog or moor, loch, and riverside. Millais never returned to "blade by blade" landscape painting, nor to the vibrant greens of his own outdoor work in the early fifties, although the assured handling of his broader, freer later style is equally accomplished in its close observation of scenery. Many were painted elsewhere in Perthshire, near Dunkeld and Birnam, where Millais rented grand houses each autumn to hunt and fish. Christmas Eve, his first full landscape snow scene, painted in 1887, was a view looking towards Murthly Castle.

=== Illustrations ===
Millais was also very successful as a book illustrator, notably for the works of Anthony Trollope and the poems of Tennyson. His complex illustrations of the parables of Jesus were published in 1864. His father-in-law commissioned stained-glass windows based on them for Kinnoull Parish Church, Kinnoull. He also provided illustrations for magazines such as Good Words. As a young man, Millais frequently went on sketching expeditions to Keston and Hayes. While there he painted a sign for an inn where he used to stay, near to Hayes church (cited in Chums Annual, 1896, page 213).

== Academic career and baronetage ==
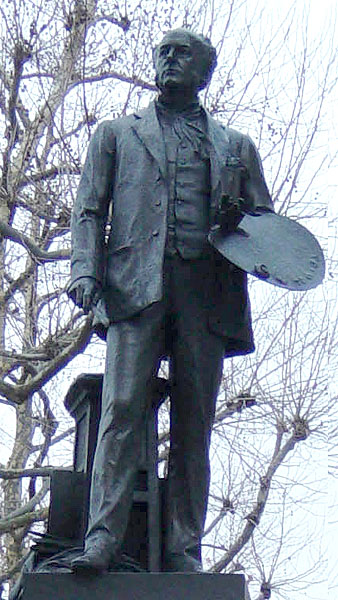
John Everett Millais (1905), Thomas Brock, Tate Britain

Millais was elected as an associate member of the Royal Academy of Arts in 1853; a decade later in 1863, he was elected as a full member of the Academy, in which he was a prominent and active participant.

In July 1885, Queen Victoria created him a baronet, of Palace Gate, in the parish of St Mary Abbot, Kensington, in the county of Middlesex, and of Saint Ouen, in the Island of Jersey, making him the first artist to be honoured with a hereditary title.

== Last years and death ==
Between 1881 and 1882, Millais was elected and acted as the president of the Royal Birmingham Society of Artists.

After the death of Lord Leighton in 1896, Millais was elected President of the Royal Academy. He died later in the same year from throat cancer. He was buried in the crypt of St Paul's Cathedral.

== Legacy ==
When Millais died in 1896, the Prince of Wales (later to become King Edward VII) chaired a memorial committee which commissioned a statue of the artist. The statue, by Thomas Brock, was installed at the front of the National Gallery of British Art (now Tate Britain) in the garden on the east side in 1905. On 23 November that year, the Pall Mall Gazette called it "a breezy statue, representing the man in the characteristic attitude in which we all knew him". In 1953, Tate director Norman Reid attempted to have it replaced by Auguste Rodin's John the Baptist, and in 1962 again proposed its removal, calling its presence "positively harmful". His efforts were frustrated by the statue's owner, the Ministry of Works. Ownership was transferred from the Ministry to English Heritage in 1996, and by them in turn to the Tate. In 2000, under Stephen Deuchar's directorship, the statue was removed to the side of the building to welcome visitors to the refurbished Manton Road entrance. In 2007, the artist was the subject of a major retrospective at Tate Britain, London visited by 151,000 people. The exhibition then traveled to the Van Gogh Museum, Amsterdam, followed by venues in Fukuoka and Tokyo, Japan, and seen by over 660,000 visitors in total.

Millais's relationship with Ruskin and Effie has been the subject of several dramas, beginning with the silent film The Love of John Ruskin from 1912. There have also been stage and radio plays and an opera. The 2014 film Effie Gray, written by Emma Thompson, featured Tom Sturridge as Millais. The Pre-Raphaelites have been the subjects of two BBC period dramas. The first, entitled The Love School, was shown in 1975, starring Peter Egan as Millais. The second was Desperate Romantics, in which Millais is played by Samuel Barnett. It was first broadcast on BBC 2 Tuesday, 21 July 2009. Laurie Kynaston portrayed Millais in the Paramount+ adaptation of Elizabeth Macneal's The Doll Factory (2023).

Millais's Ophelia provided inspiration for the cover art for Taylor Swift's 2026 album, The Life of a Showgirl, the lead single of which is "The Fate of Ophelia".

== Gallery ==
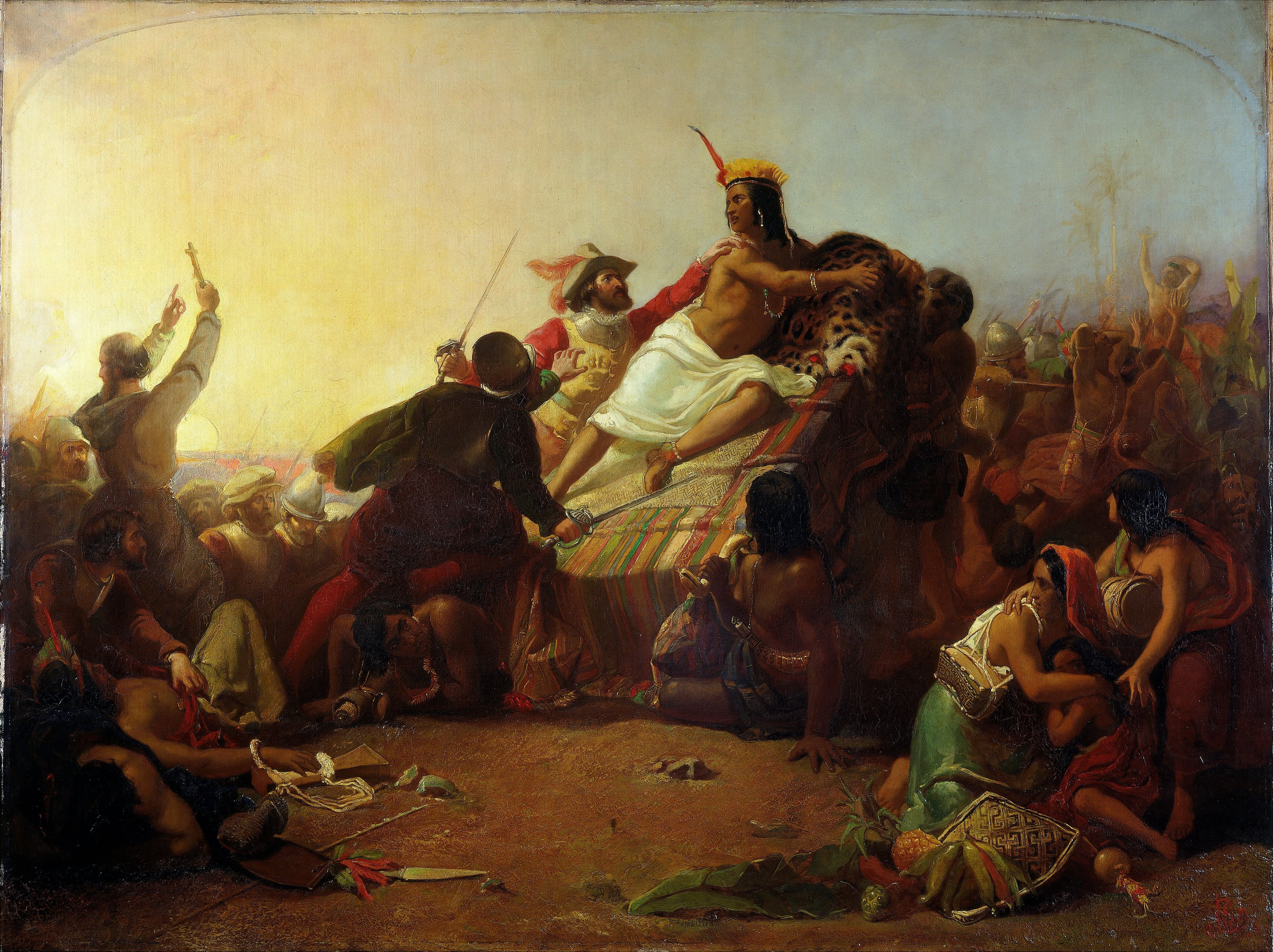
Pizarro Seizing the Inca of Peru (1846)

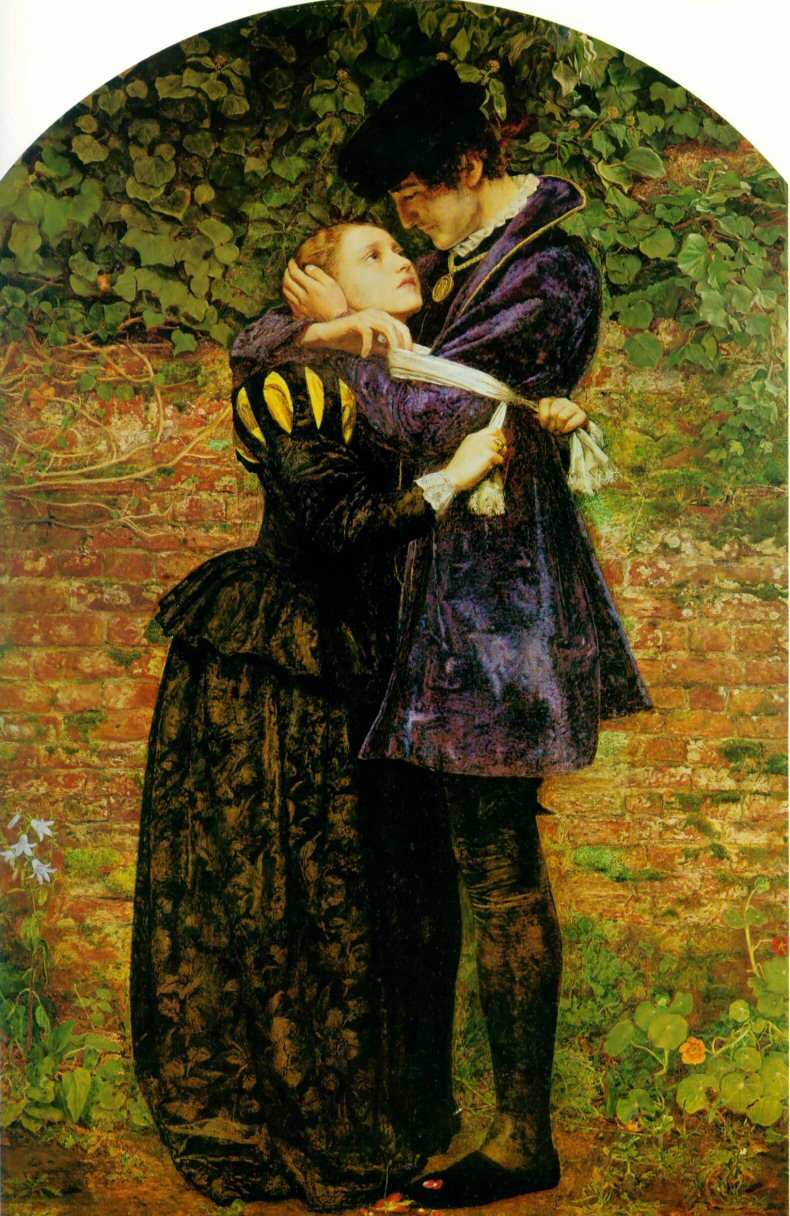
A Huguenot on St Bartholomew's Day (1851–52)

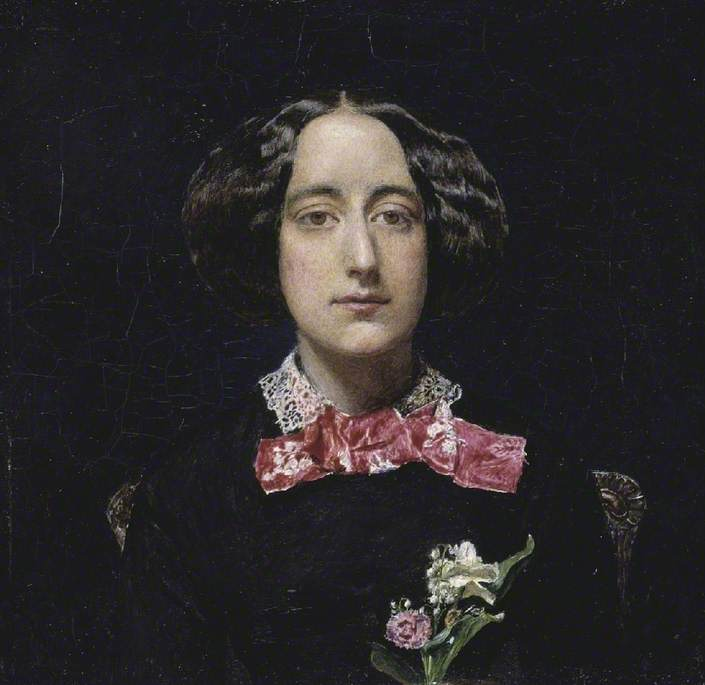
Mrs Coventry Patmore (Emily Augusta Patmore) (1851) Fitzwilliam Museum

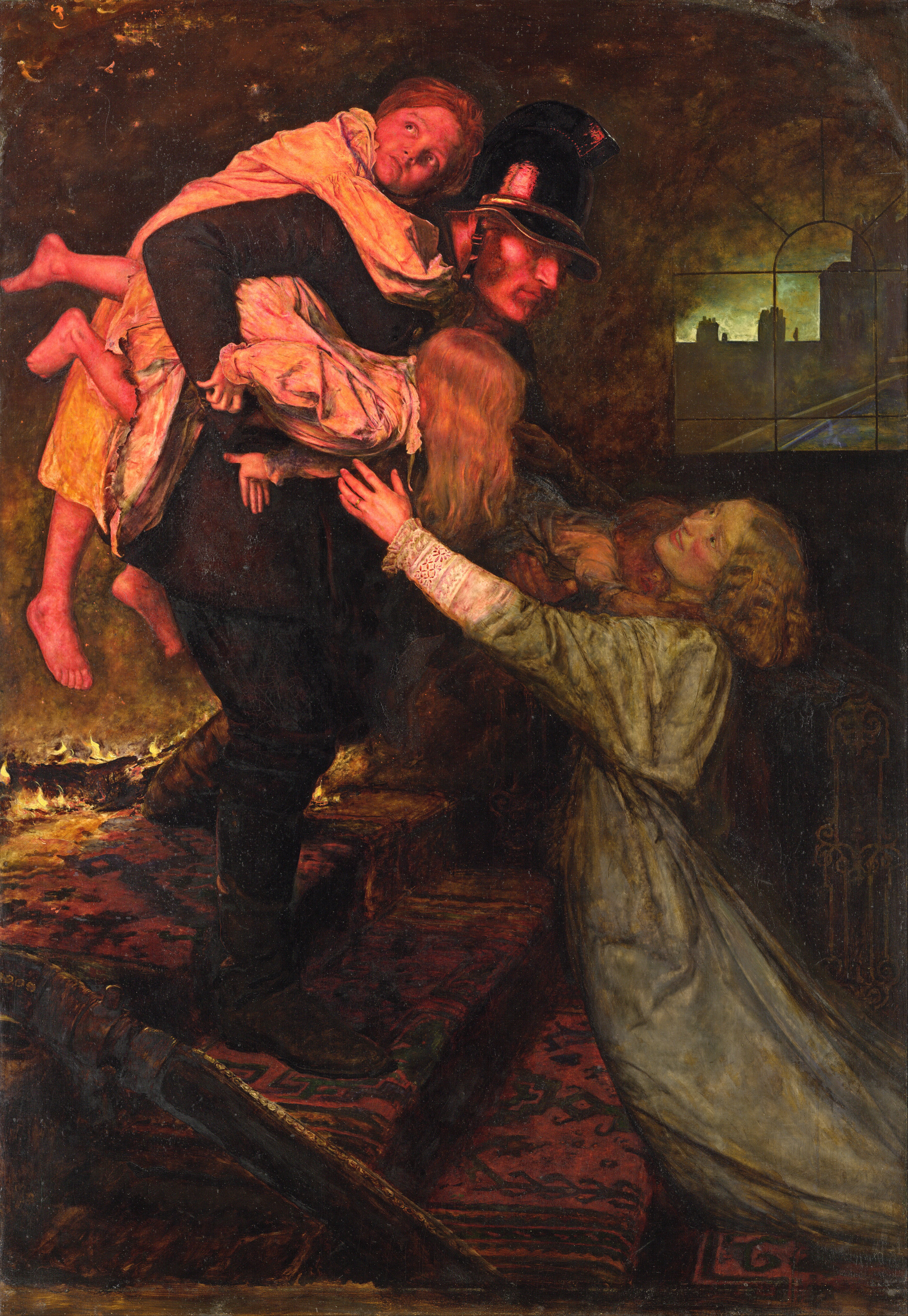
The Rescue, (1855)
National Gallery of Victoria, Melbourne

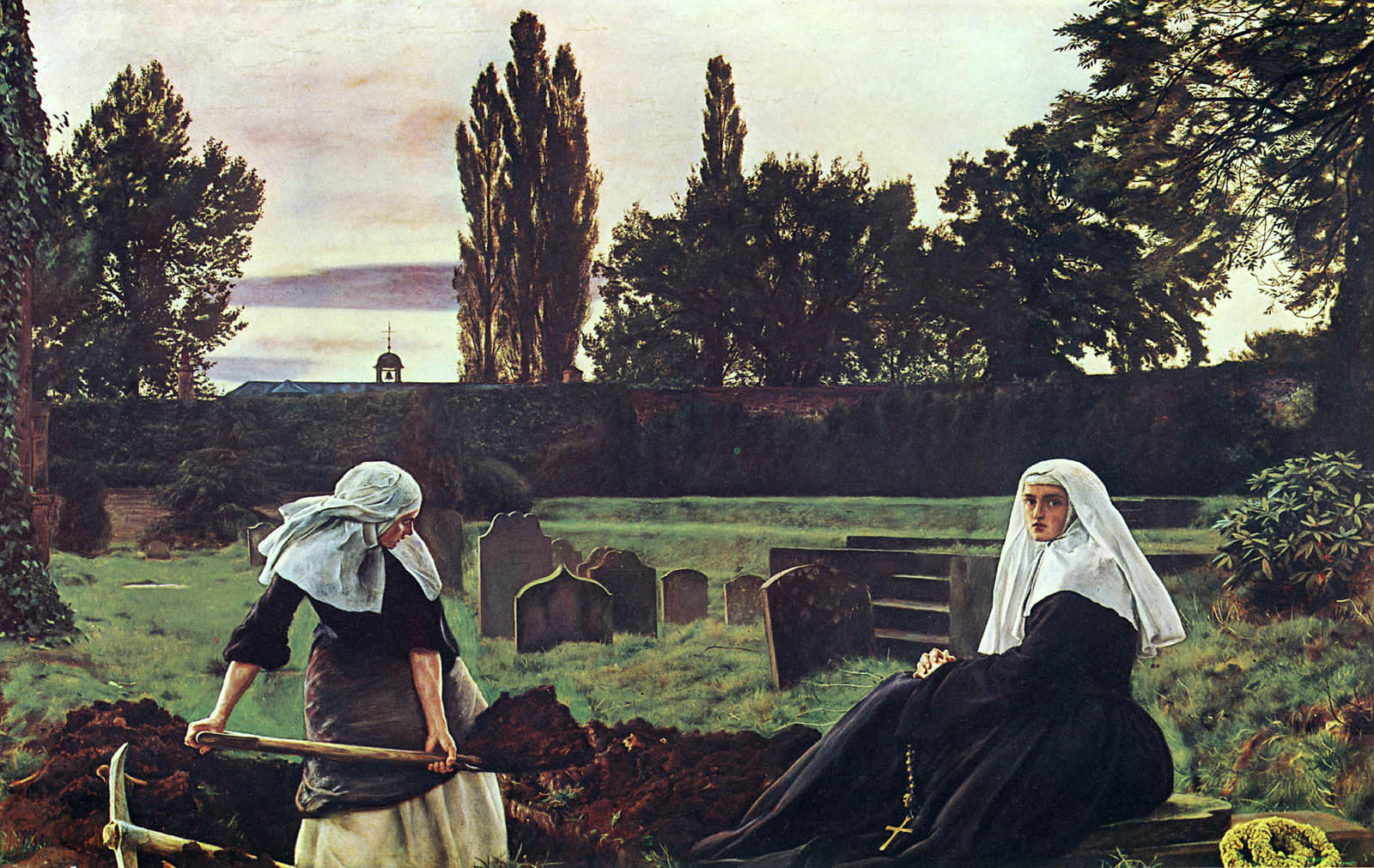
The Vale of Rest (1858–59) Tate Britain, London

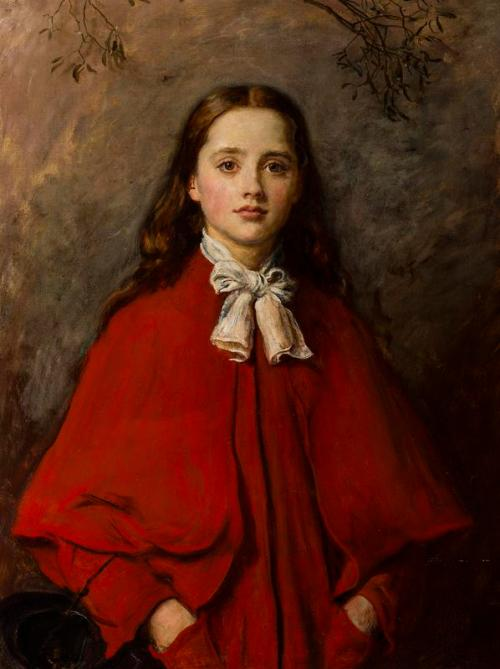
Bright Eyes (1877), Aberdeen Archives, Gallery & Museums Collection

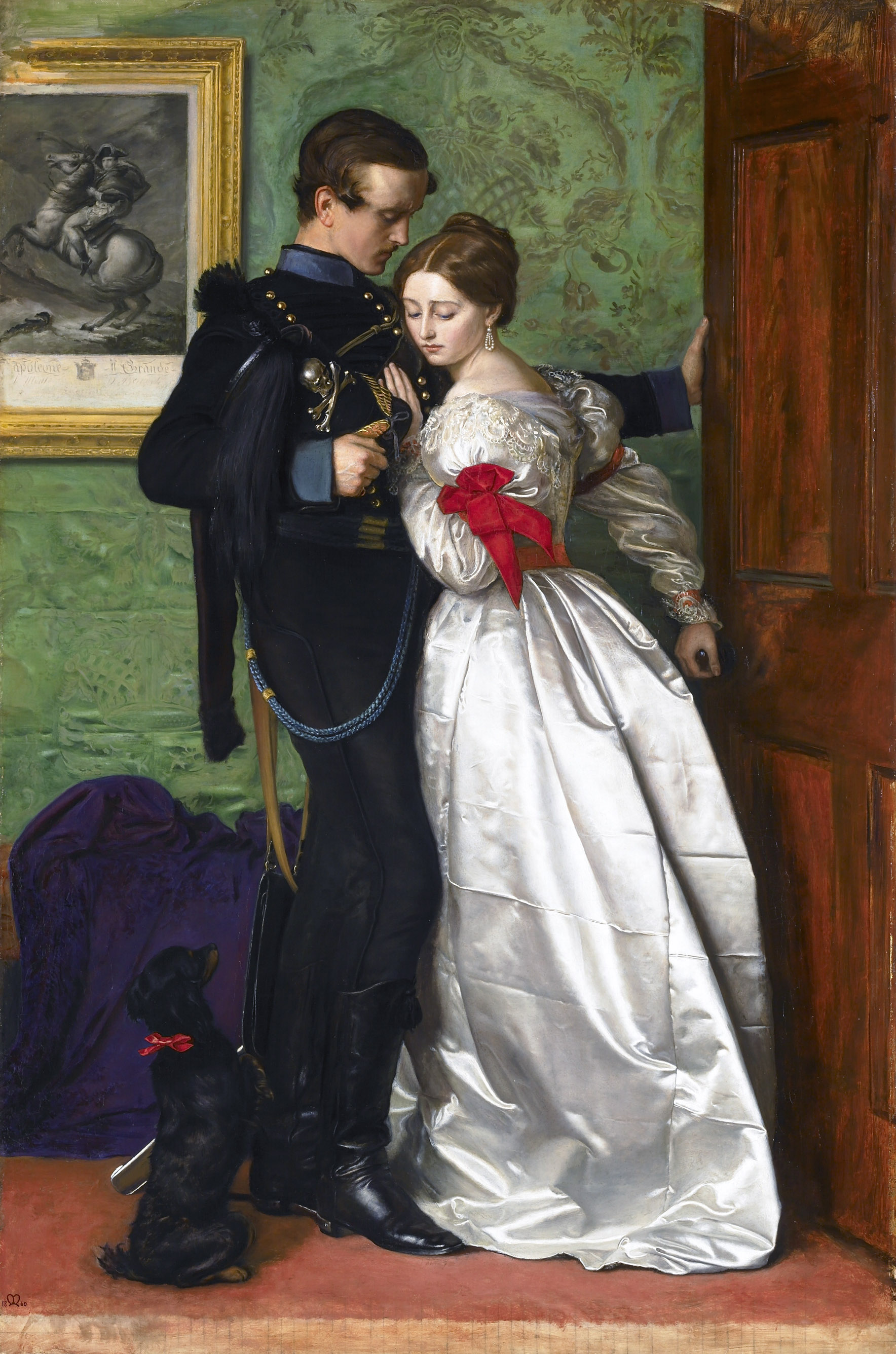
The Black Brunswicker (1860)

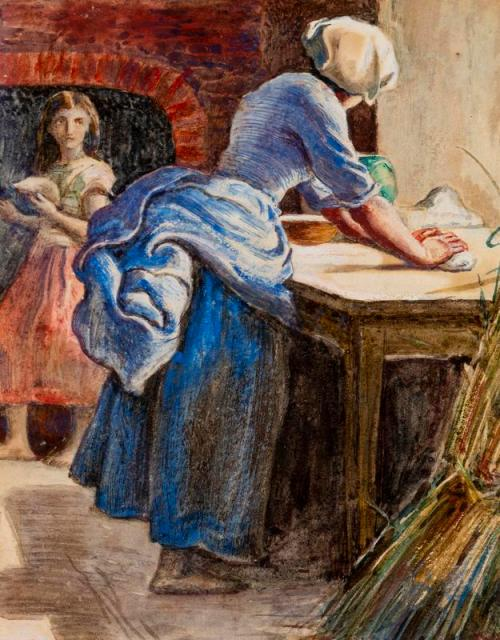
Parable - The Leaven (c. 1860), Aberdeen Archives, Gallery & Museums Collection

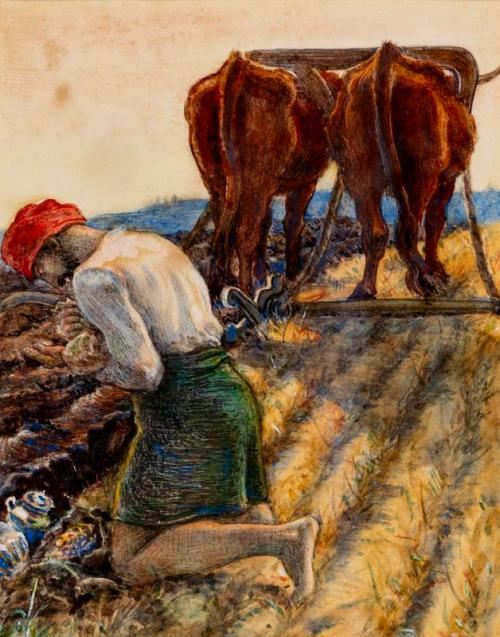
Parable - The Hidden Treasure (c. 1860), Aberdeen Archives, Gallery & Museums Collection

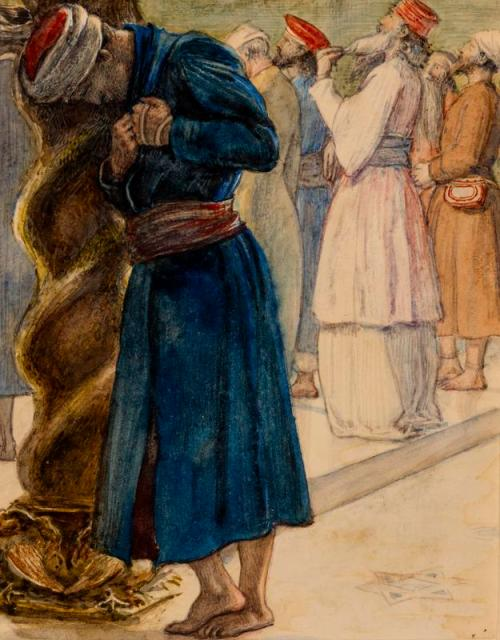
Parable - The Pharisee and the Publican (c. 1860), Aberdeen Archives, Gallery & Museums Collection

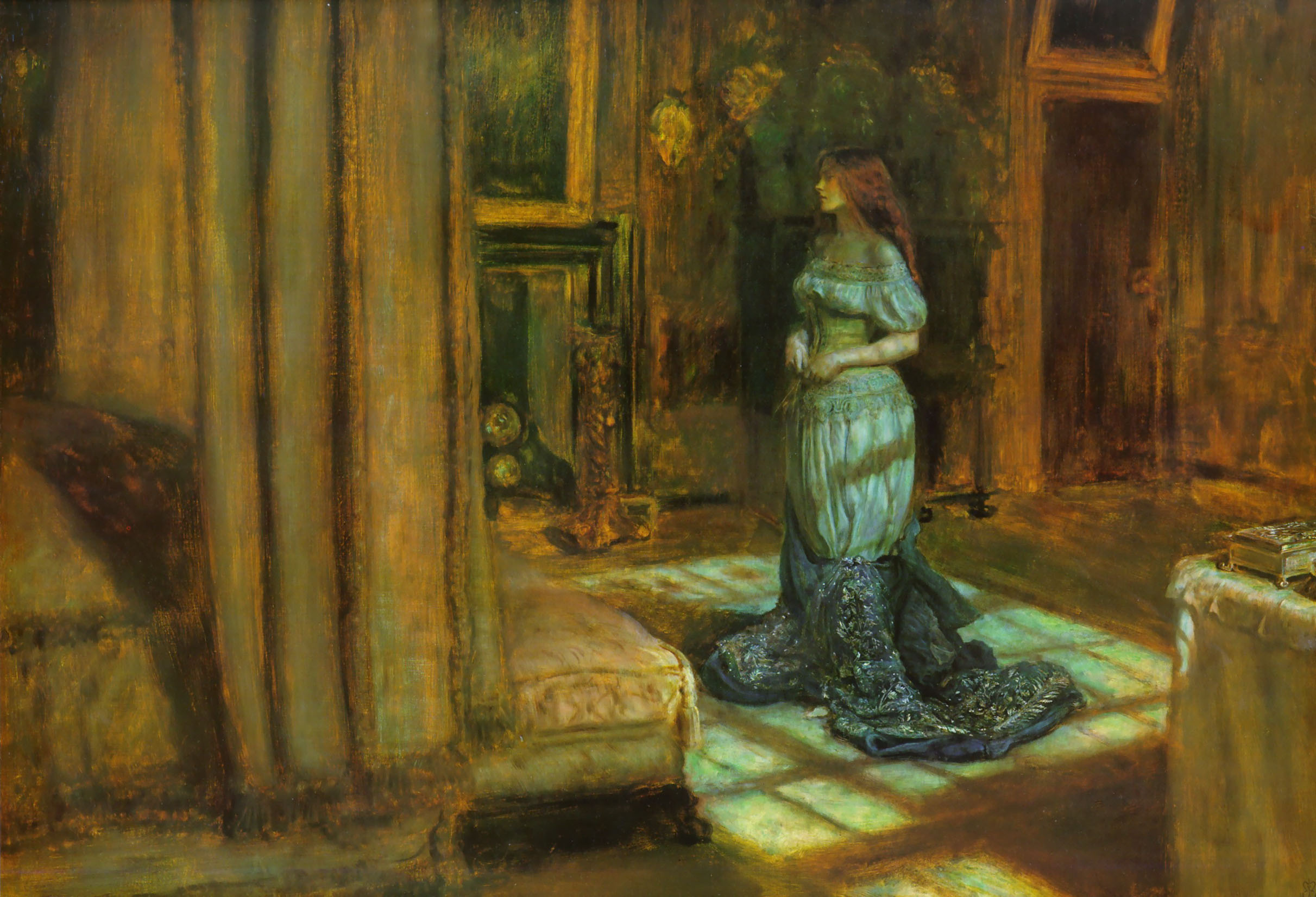
The Eve of St Agnes (1863)
Royal Collection

Charlie Is My Darling, 1864

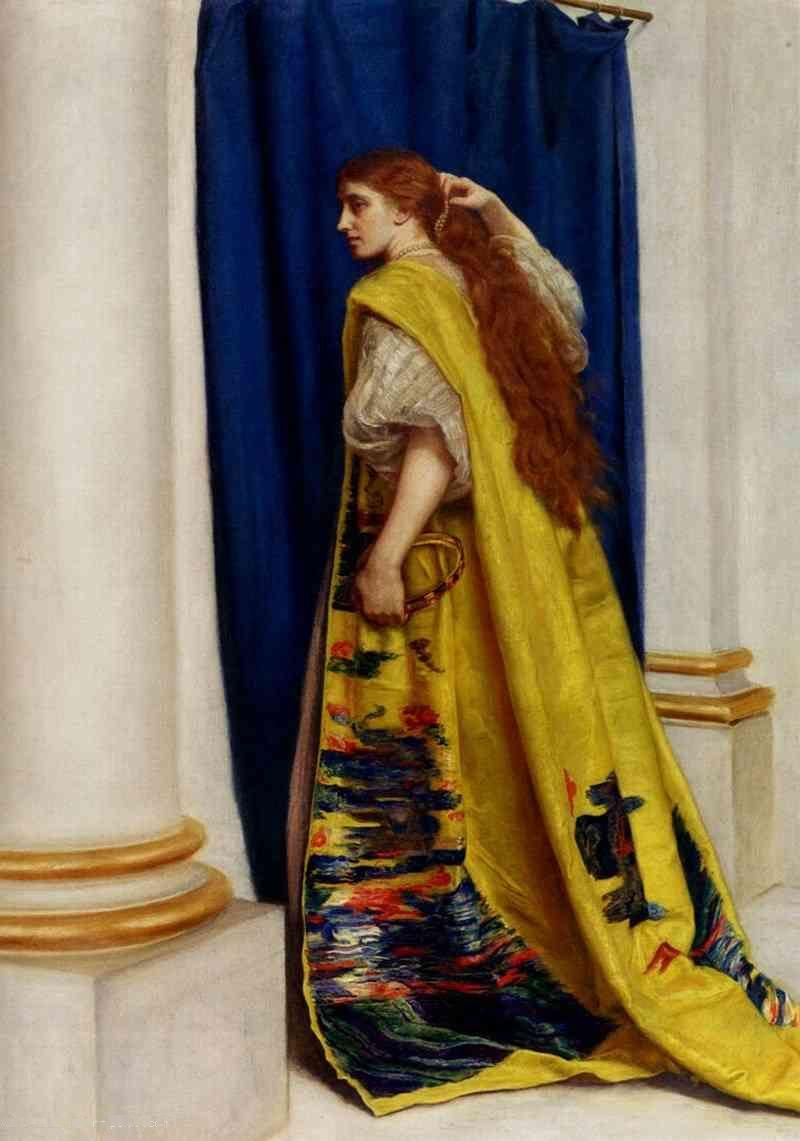
Esther (1865) Private Collection

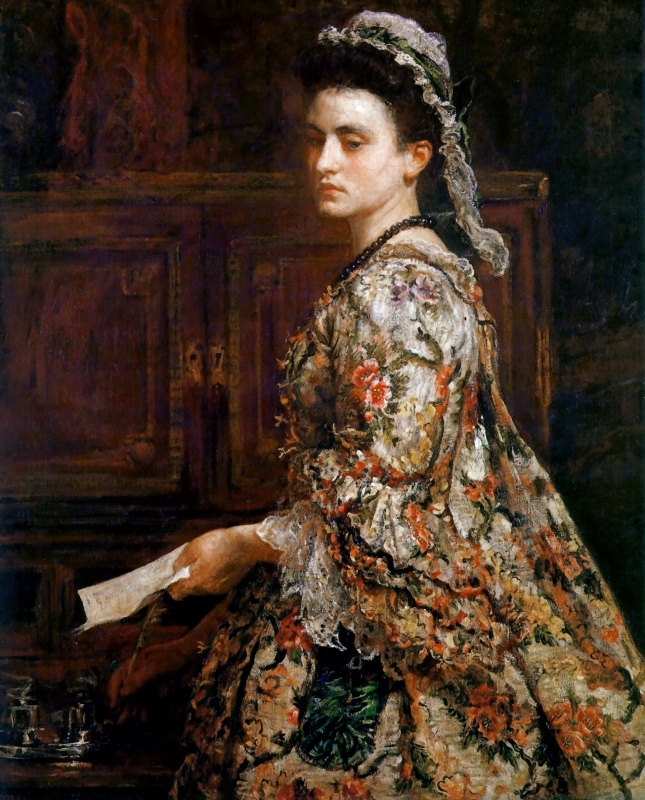
Vanessa (1868)
Liverpool Museums Service

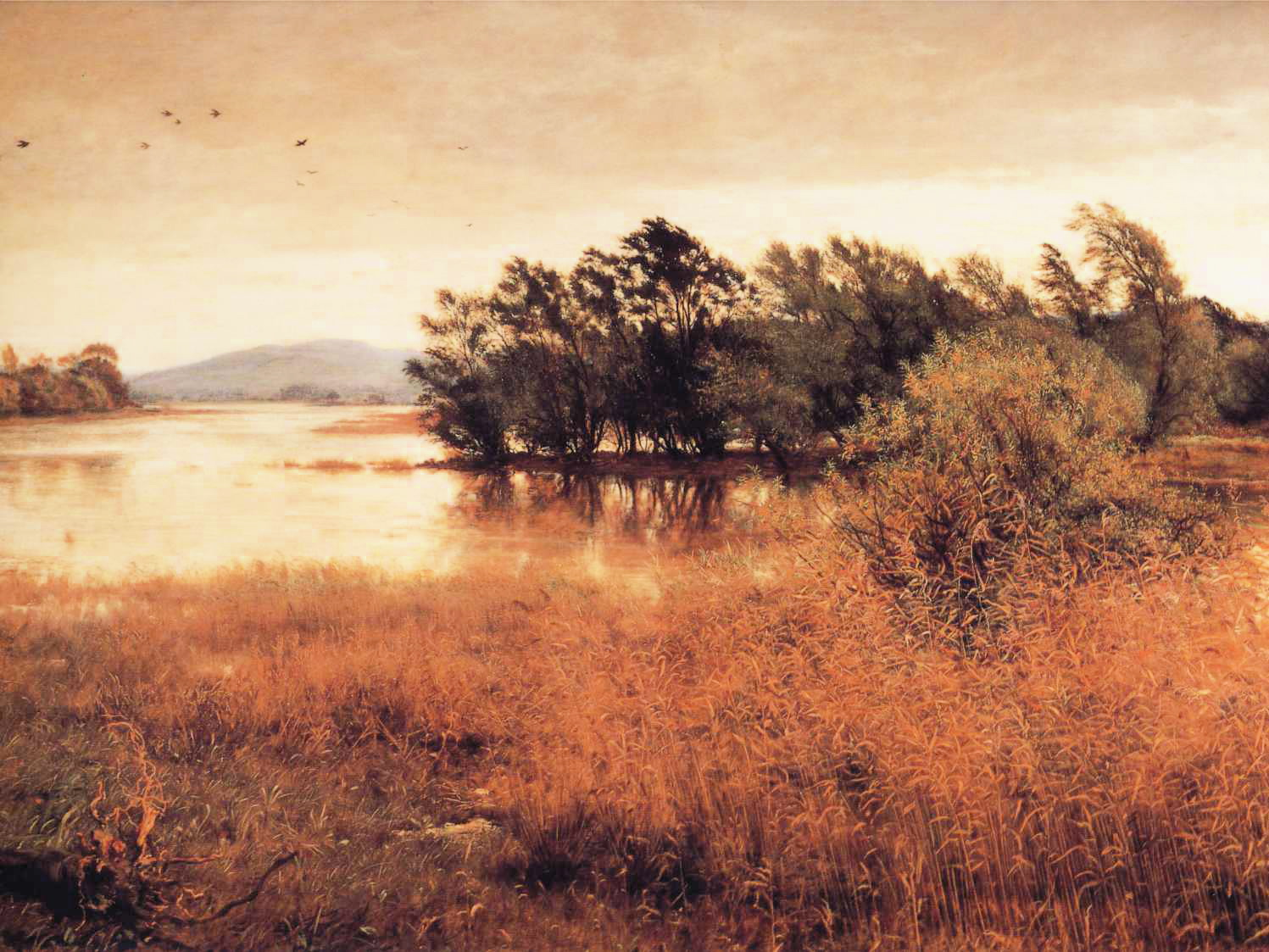
Chill October (1870), private collection

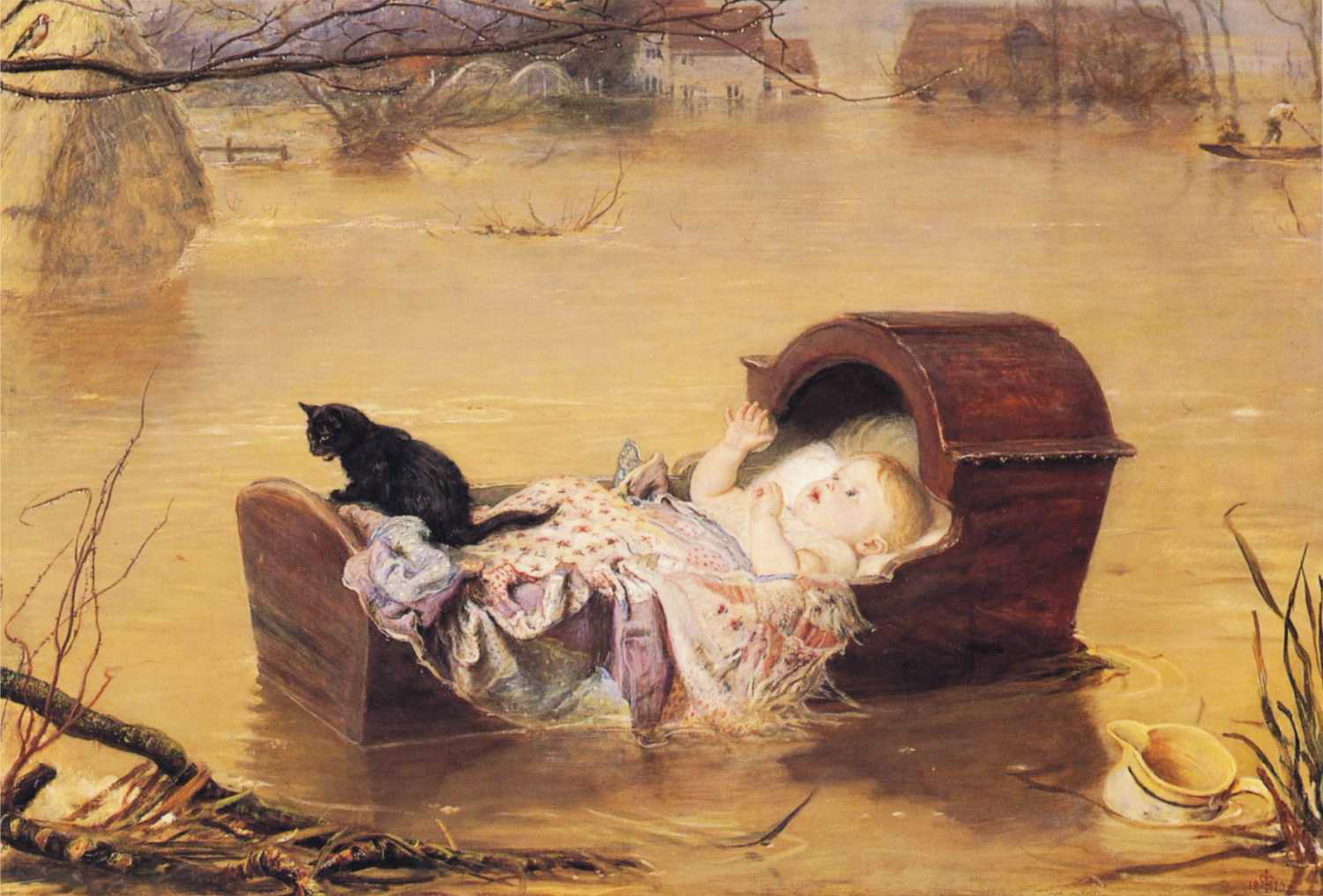
A Flood (1870), Manchester Art Gallery

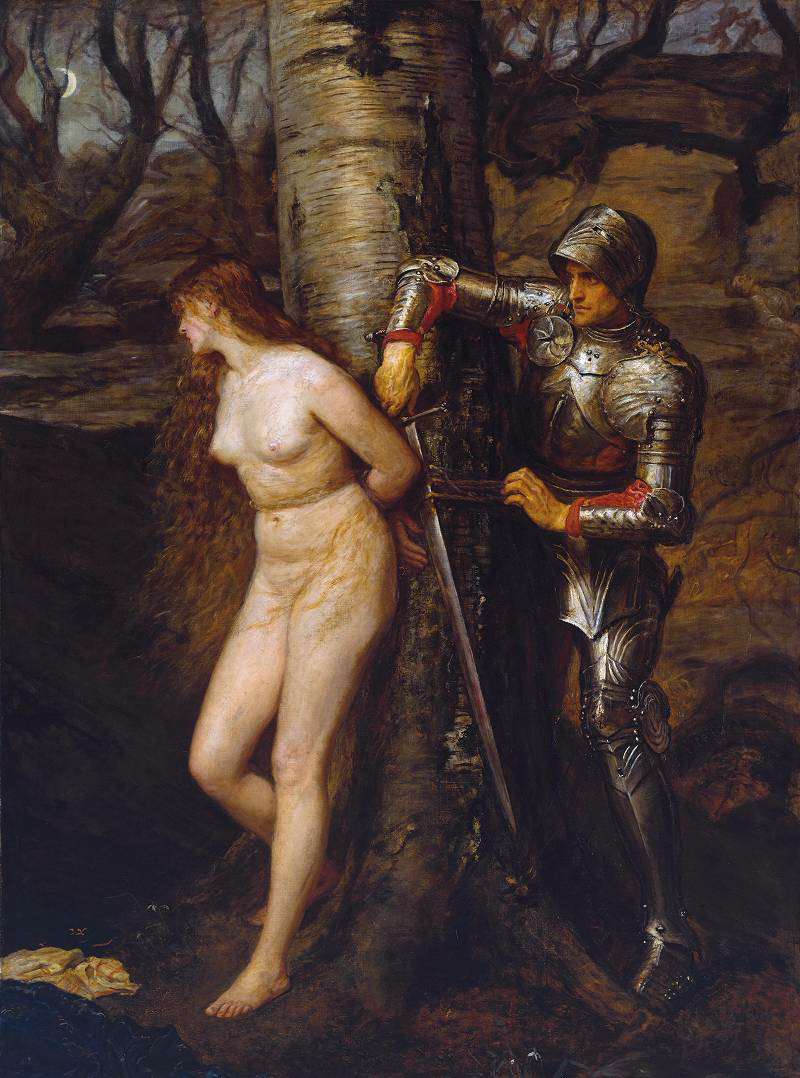
The Knight Errant (1870), Tate Britain

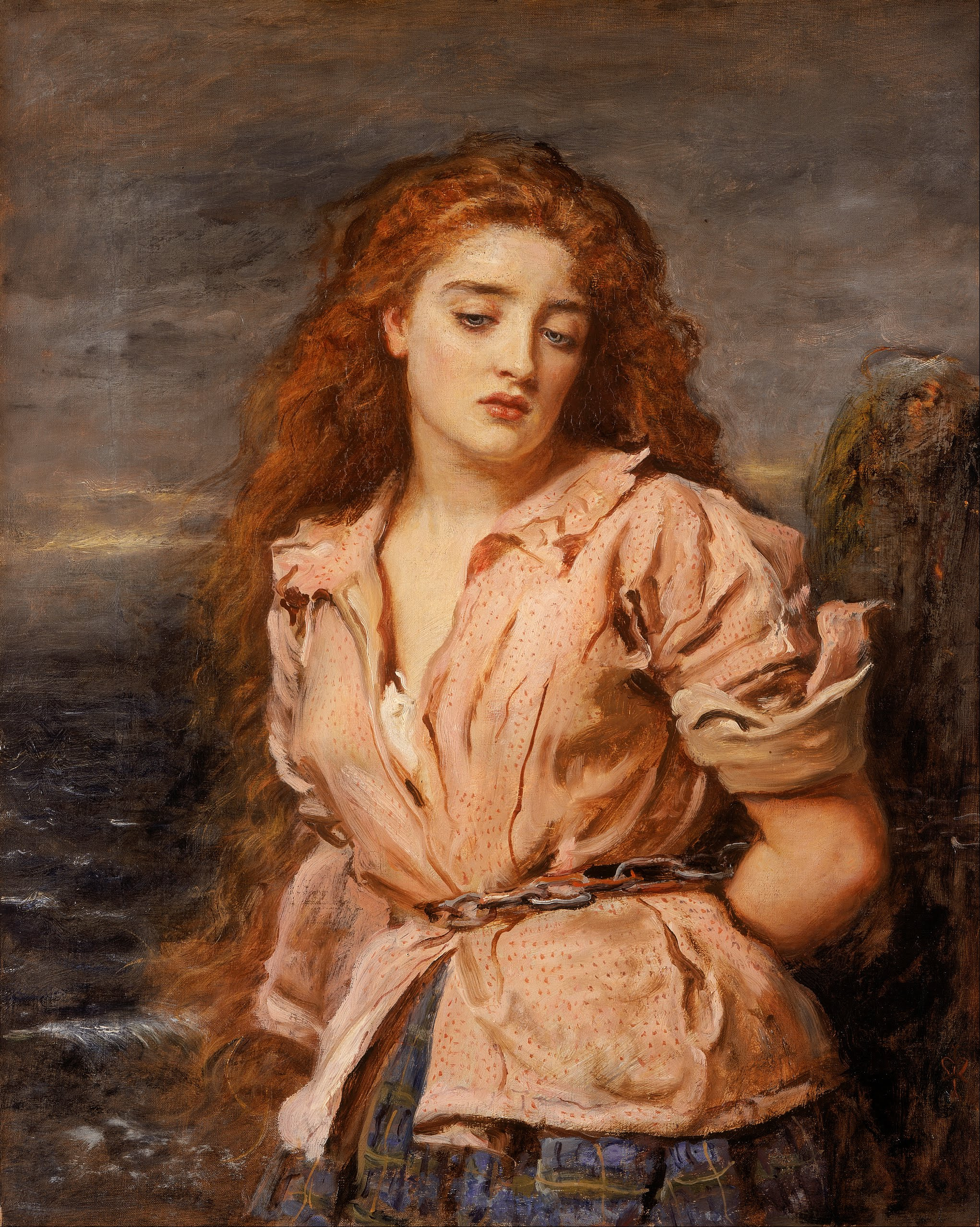
The Martyr of the Solway (1871), Walker Art Gallery

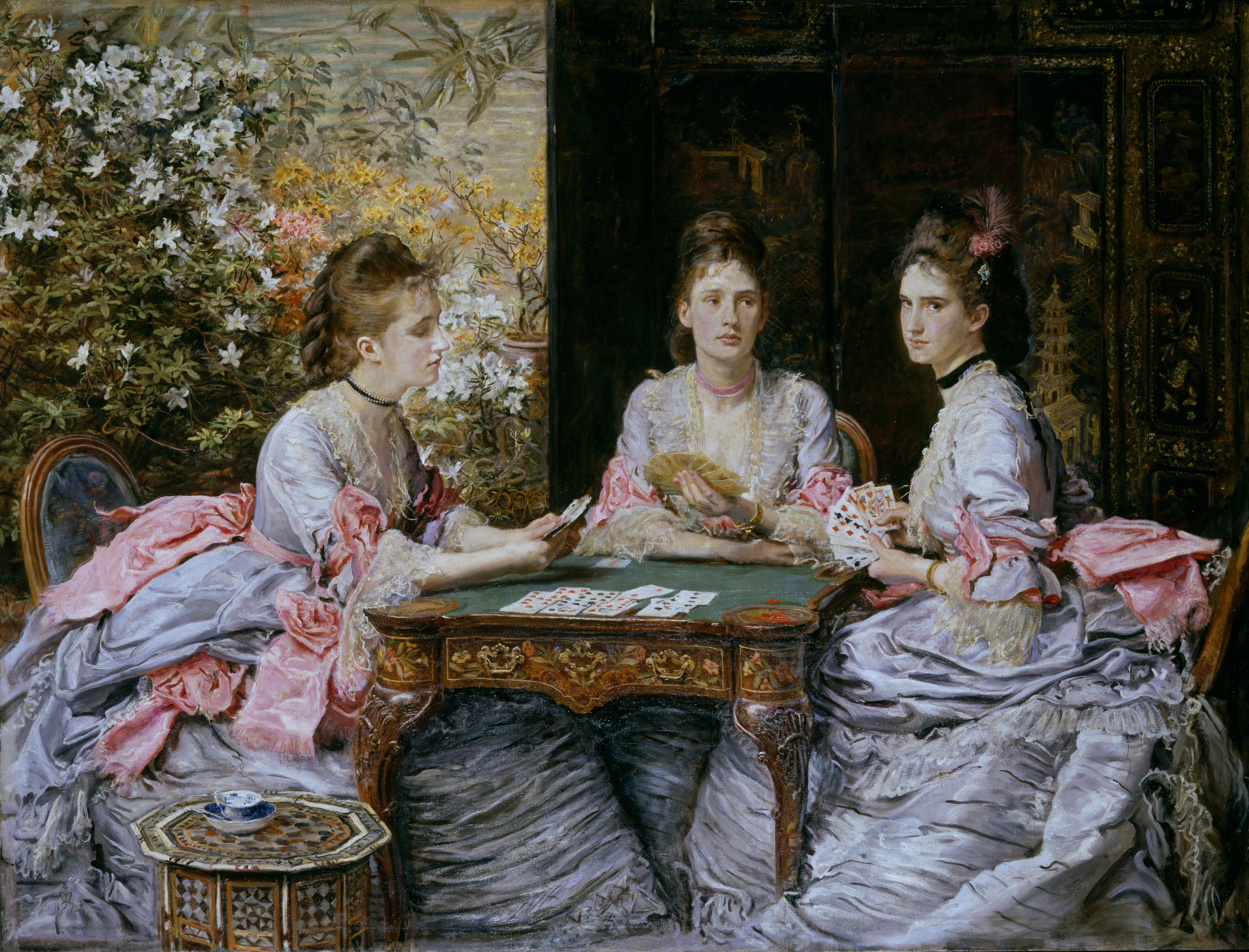
Hearts are Trumps (1872), Tate Britain

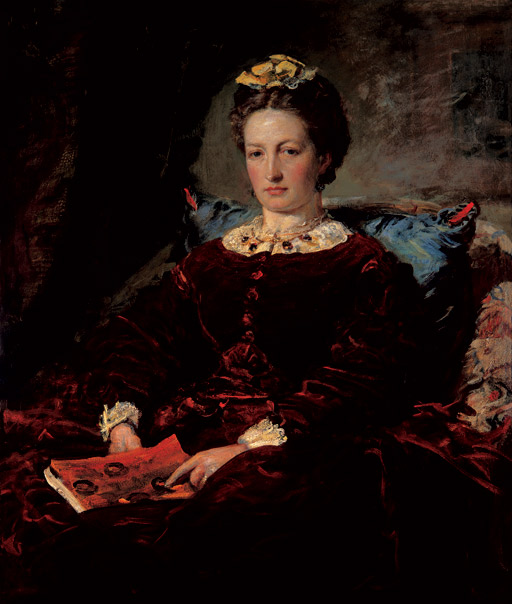
Portrait of Effie Millais (1873), Perth Museum and Art Gallery

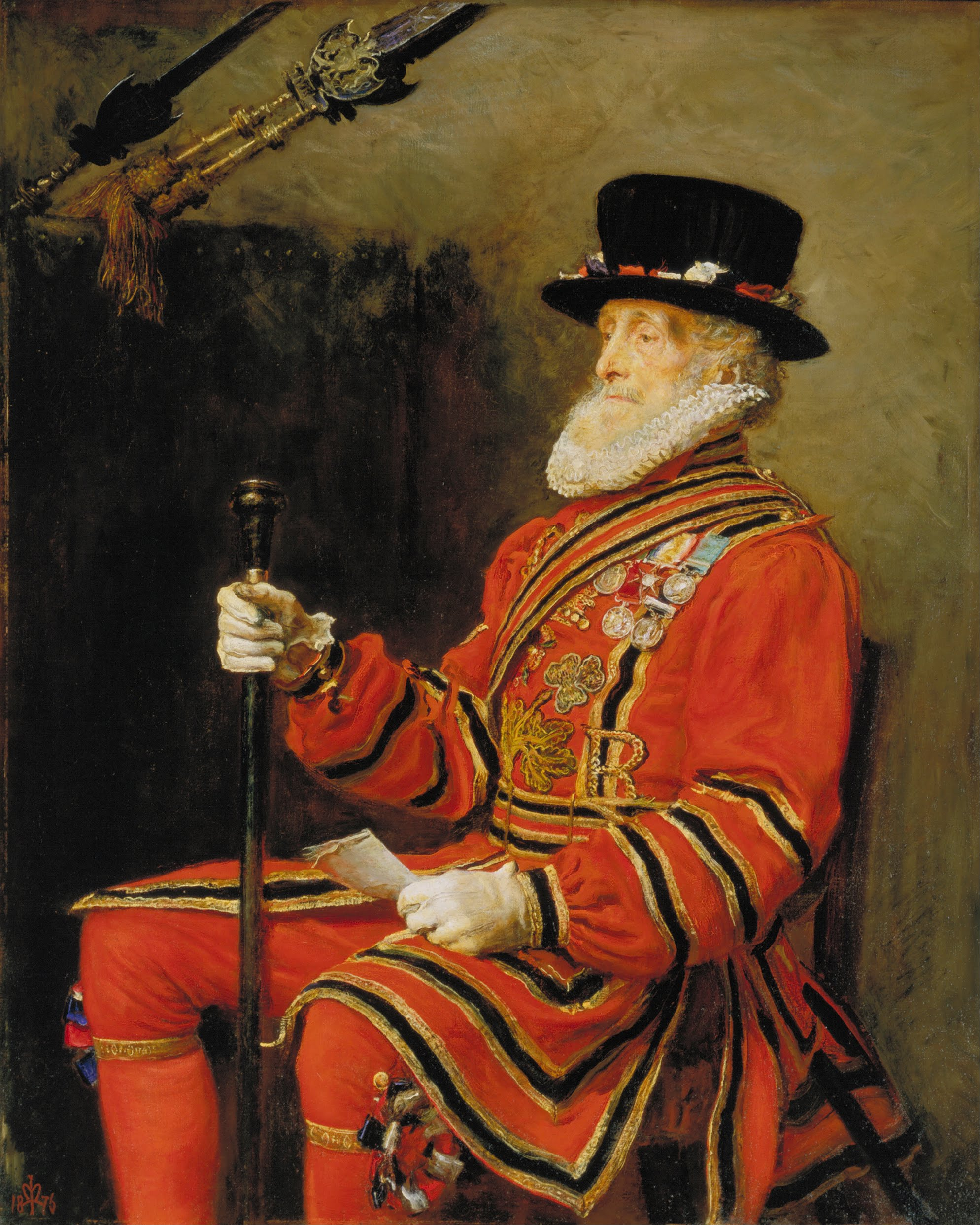
The Yeoman of the Guard (1876)

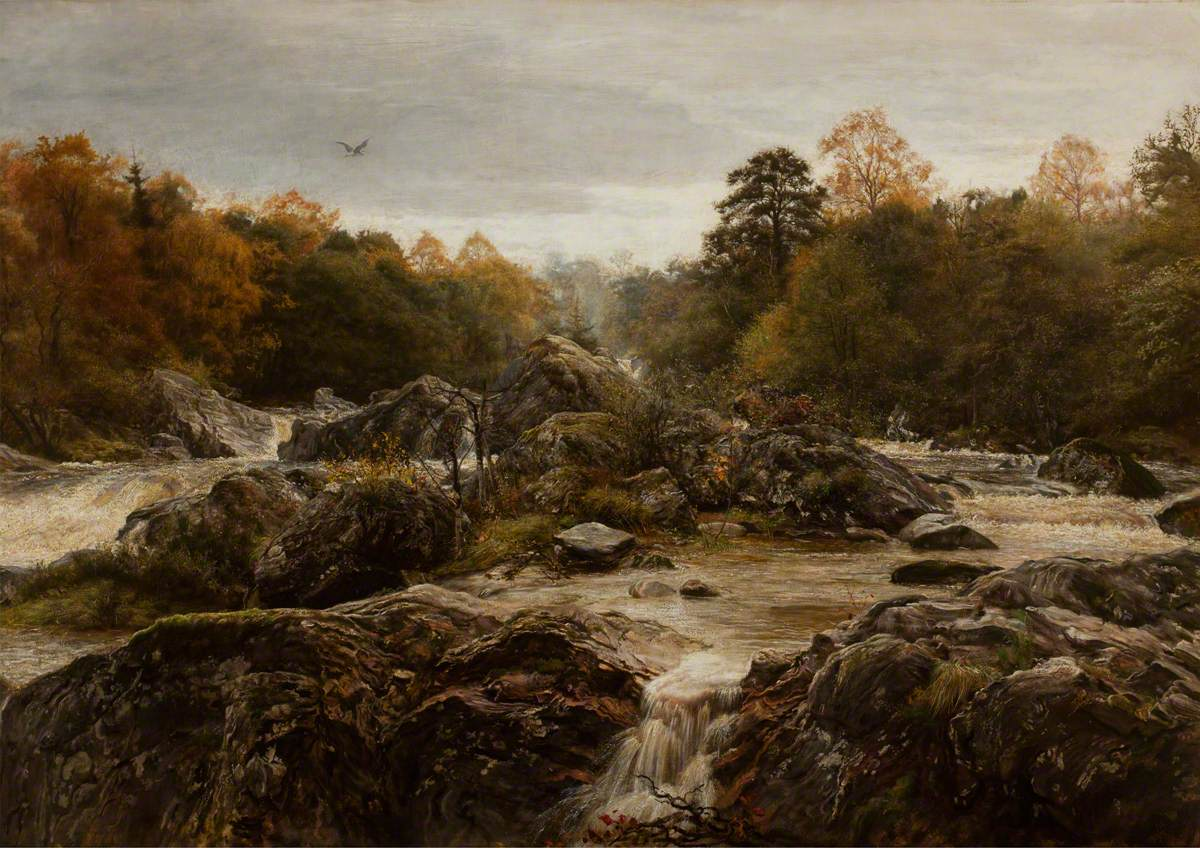
The Sound of Many Waters (1876)

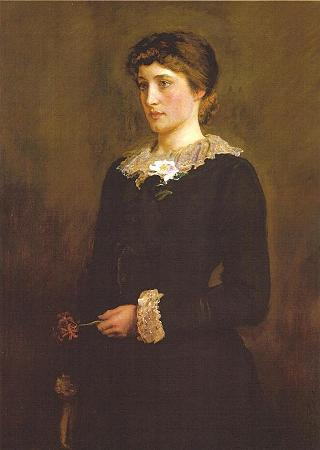
A Jersey Lily (1878)

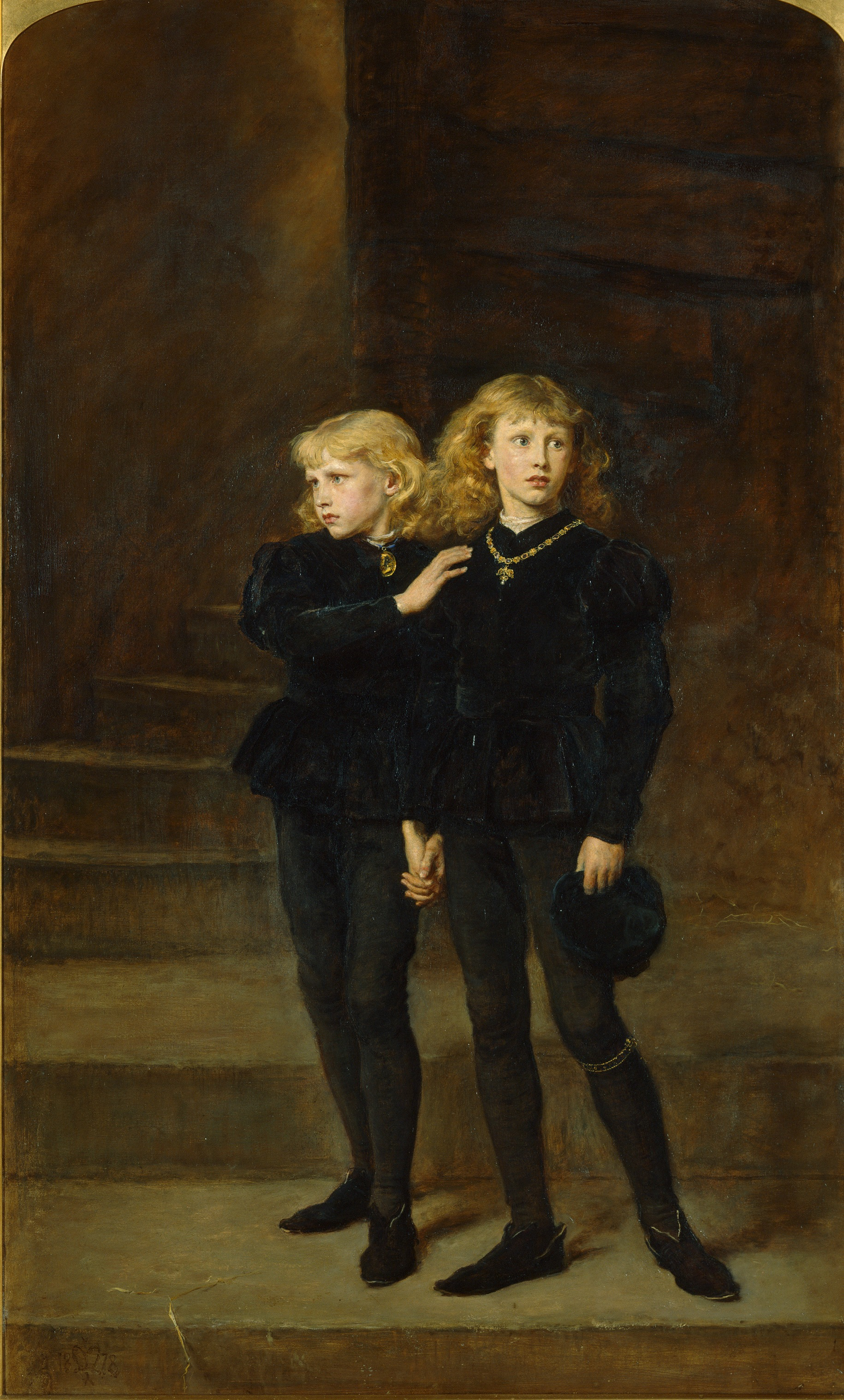
The Princes in the Tower (1878), Royal Holloway College

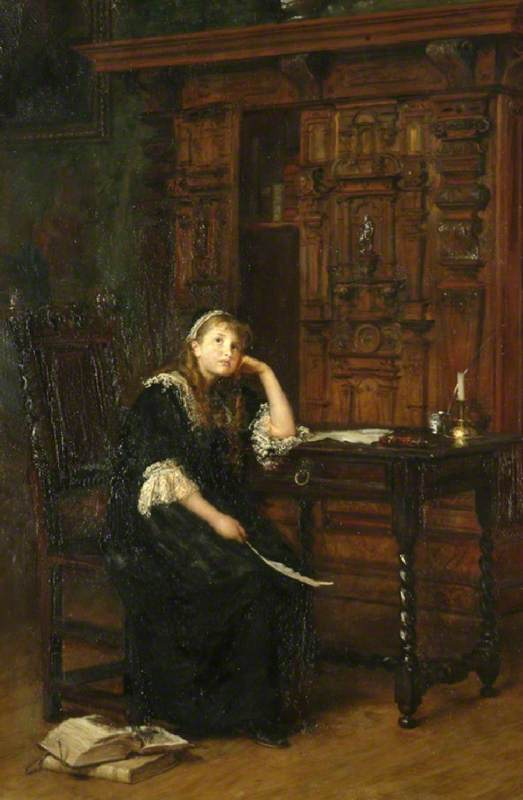
Princess Elizabeth in Prison at St James's (1879), Royal Holloway College

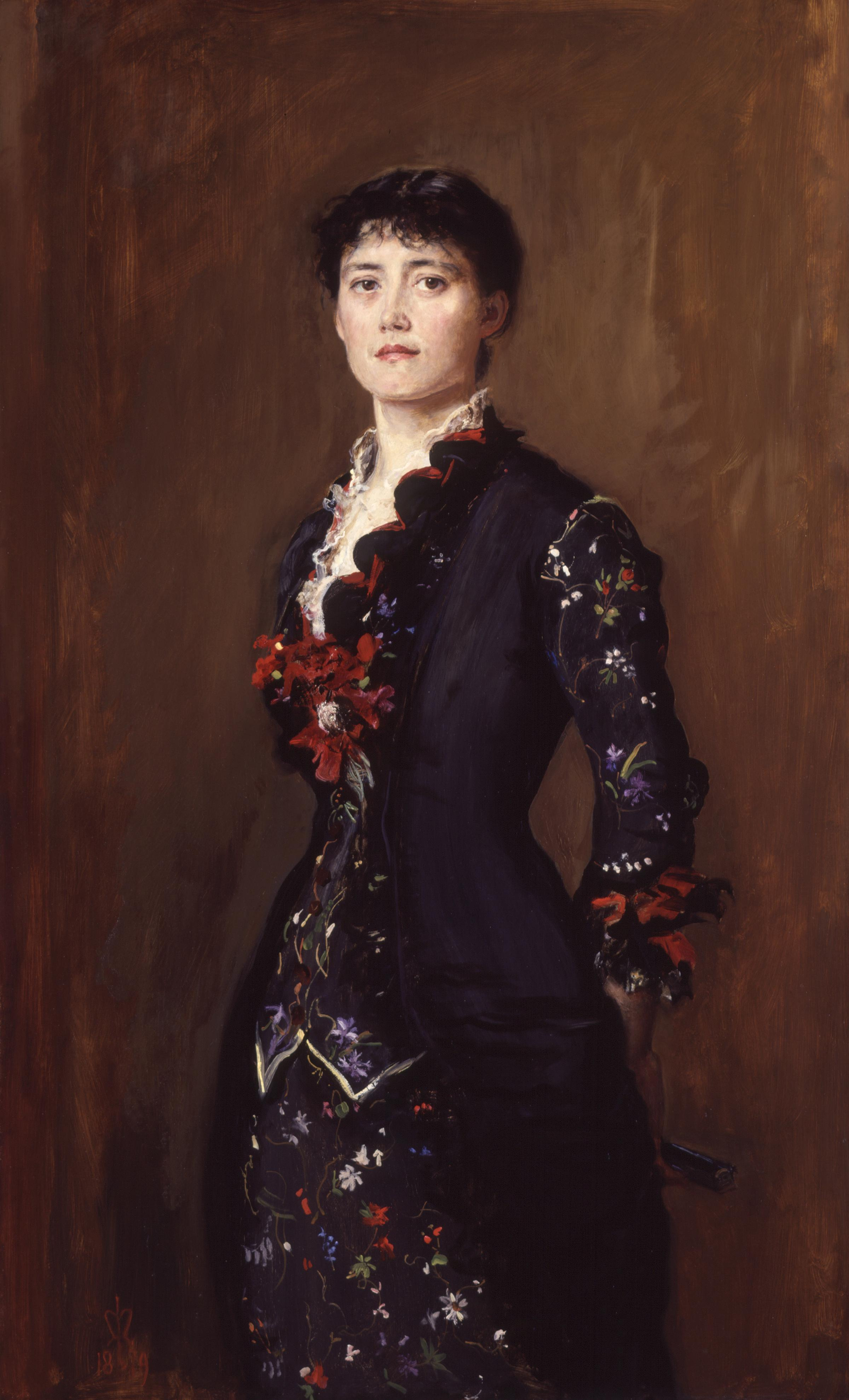
Louise Jane Jopling (1879) National Portrait Gallery (London)

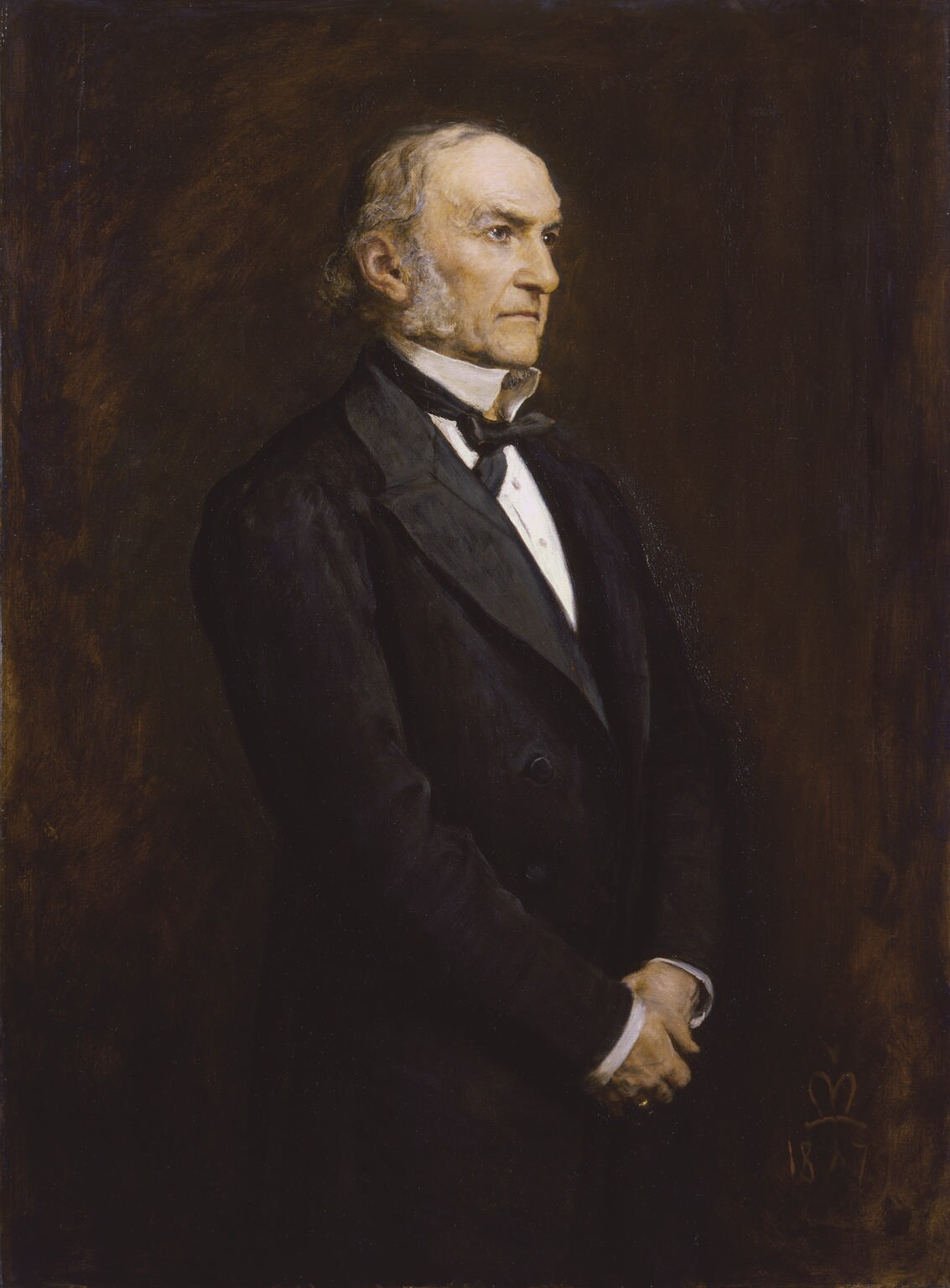
Portrait of William Ewart Gladstone (1879)

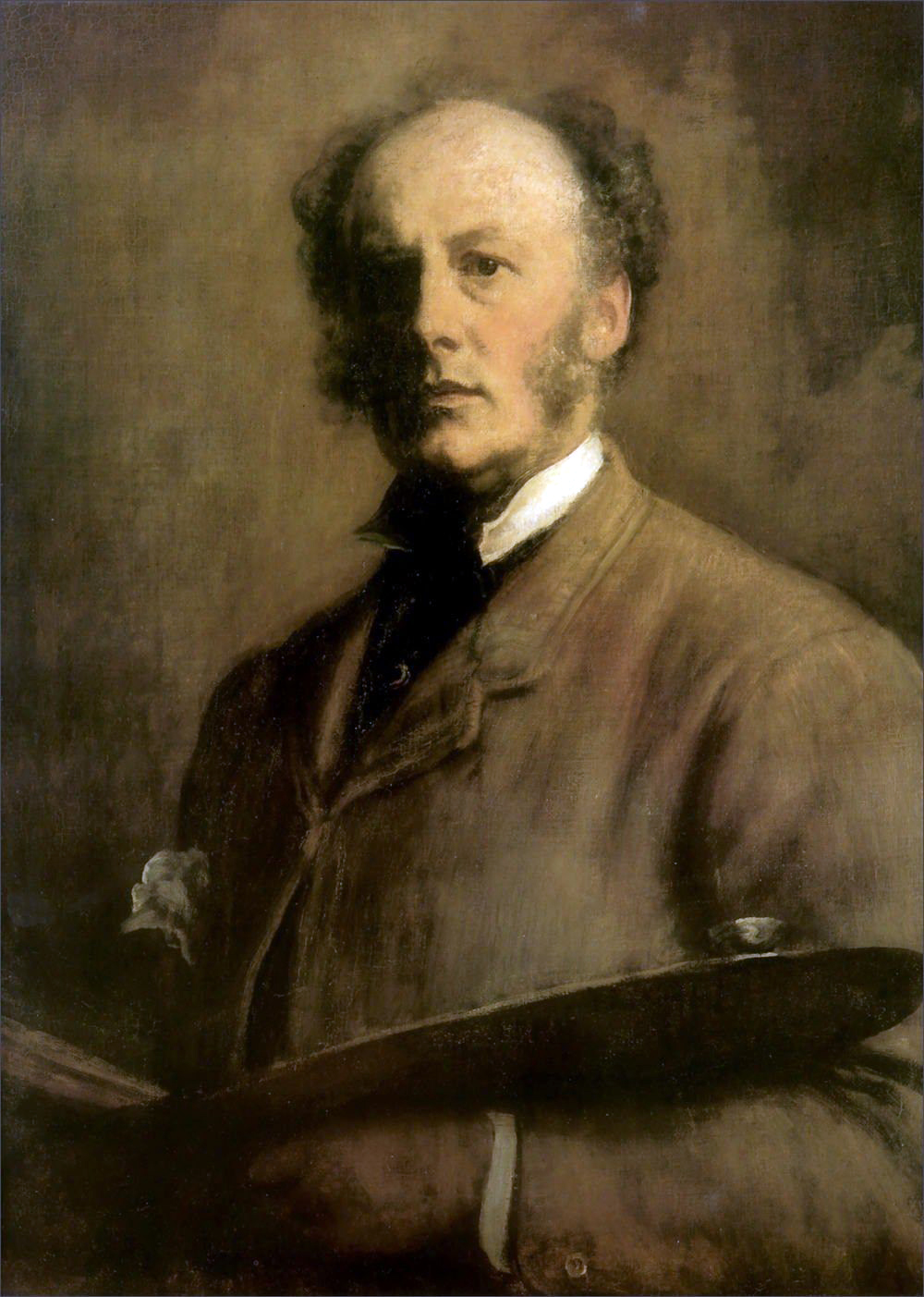
Self-portrait (1881)

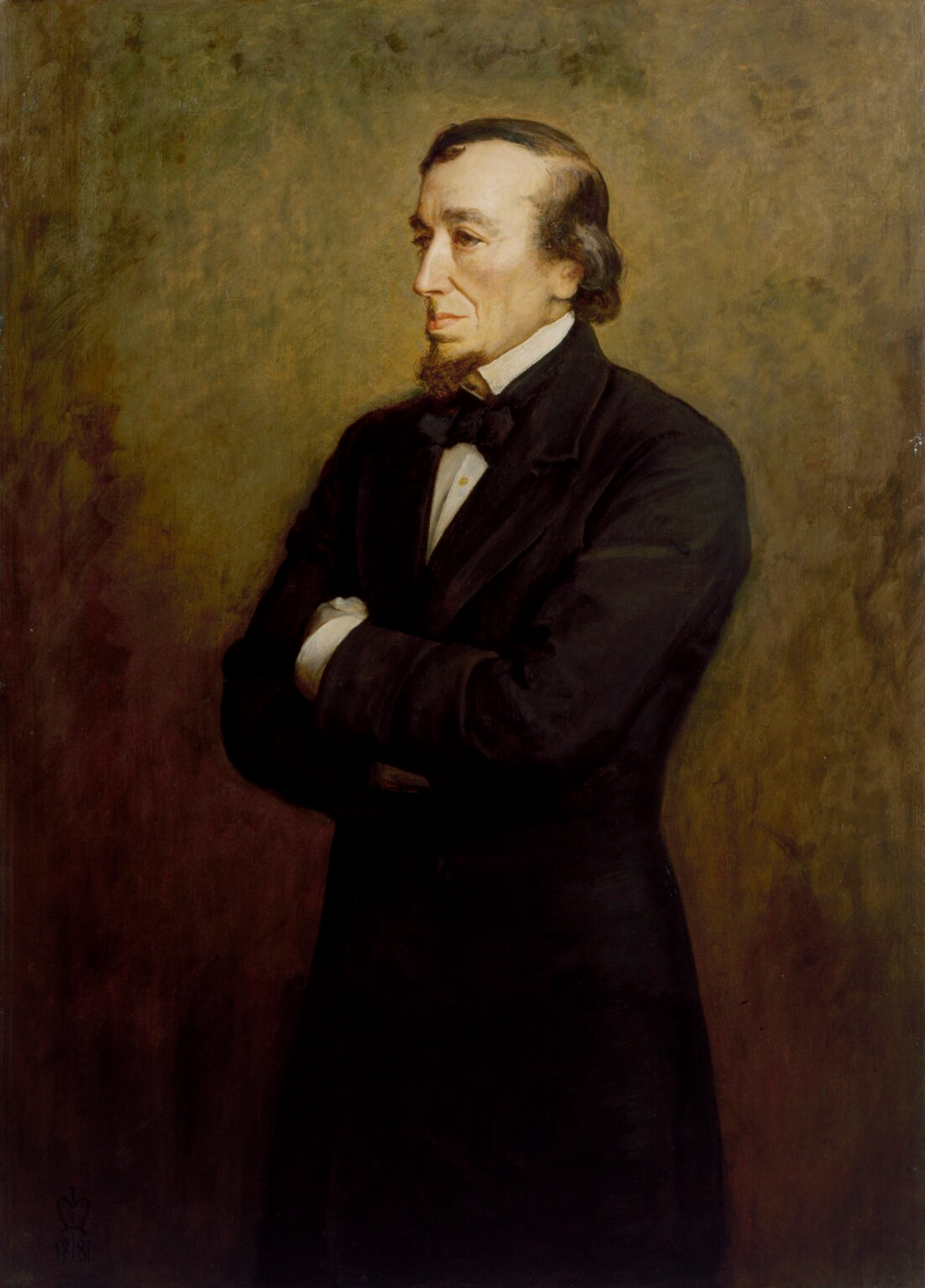
Portrait of Benjamin Disraeli (1881) National Portrait Gallery

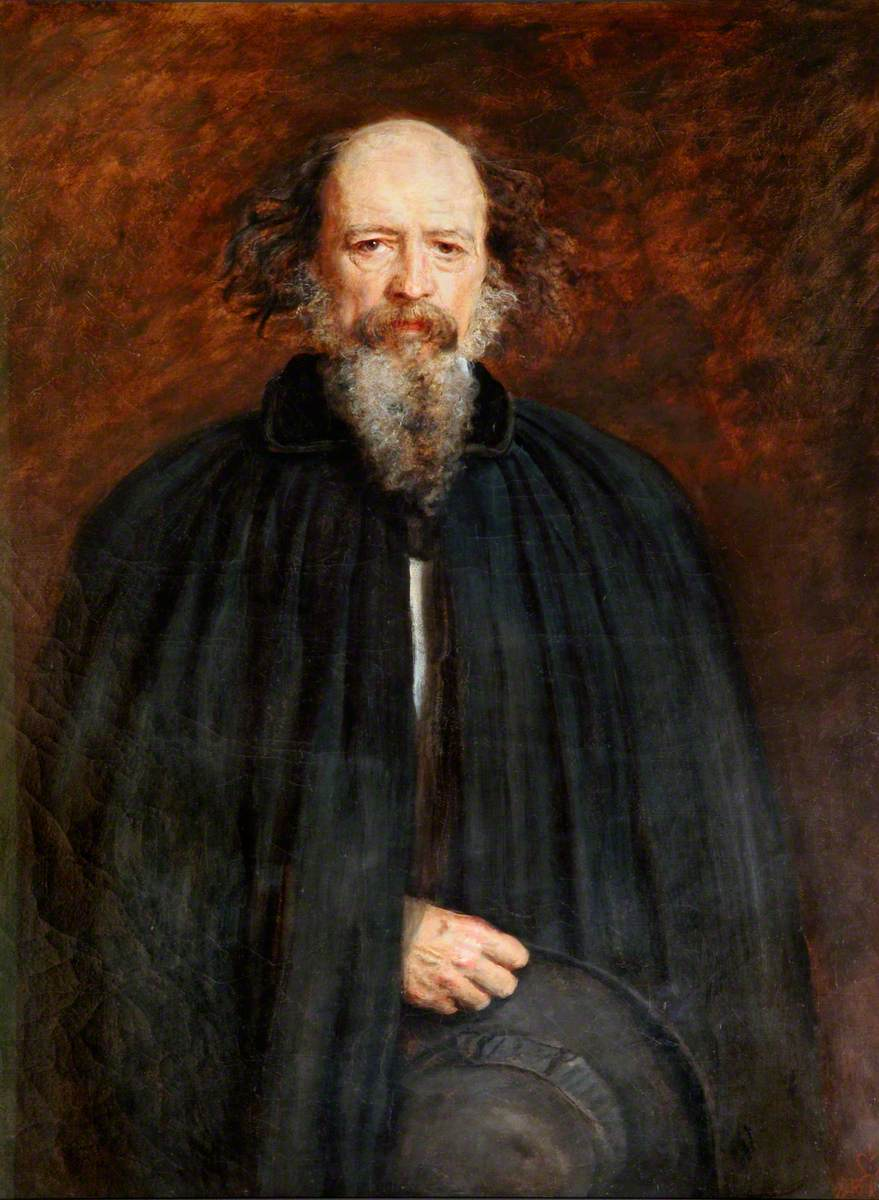
Portrait of Alfred Tennyson (1881)

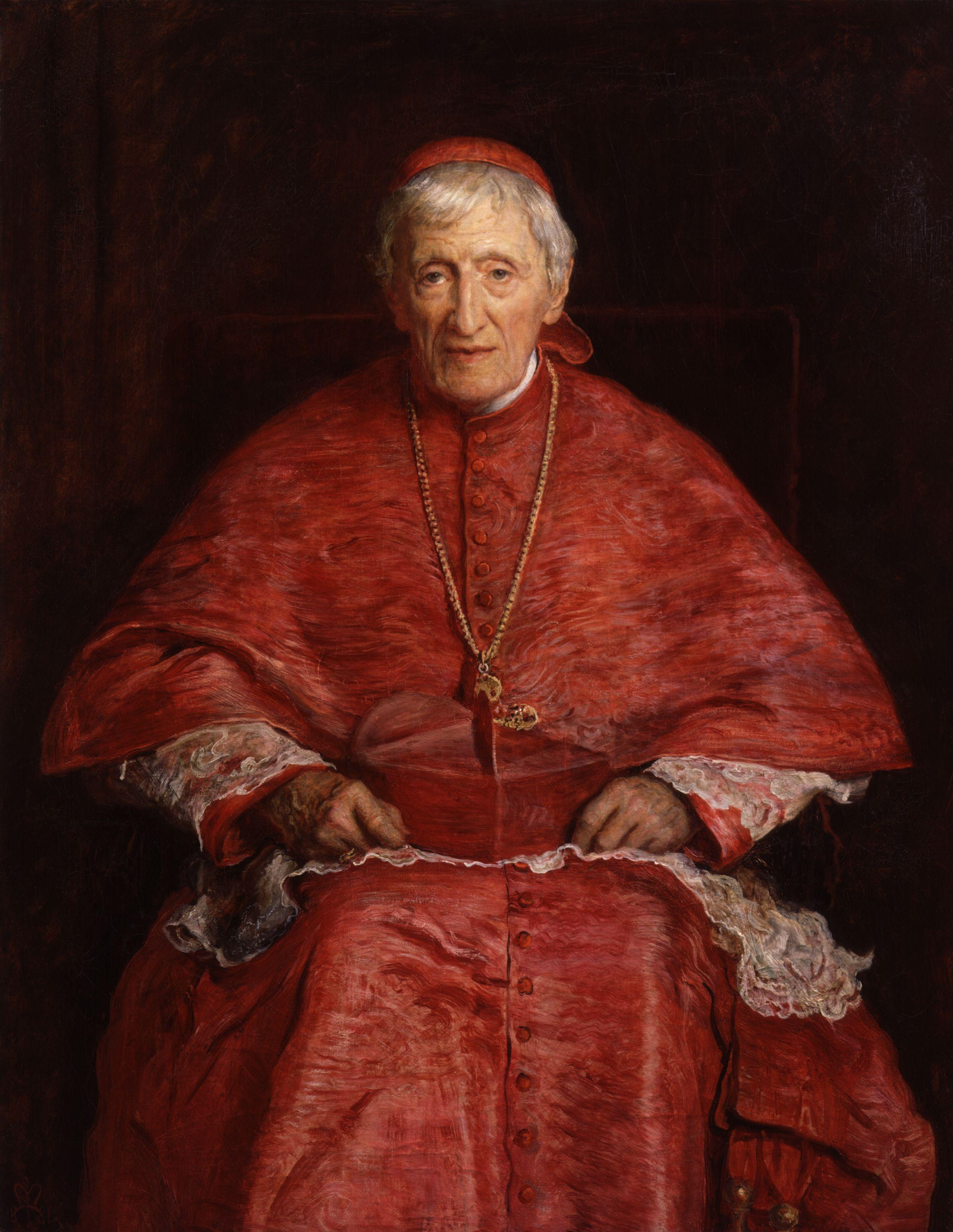
John Henry Newman (1881) National Portrait Gallery (London)

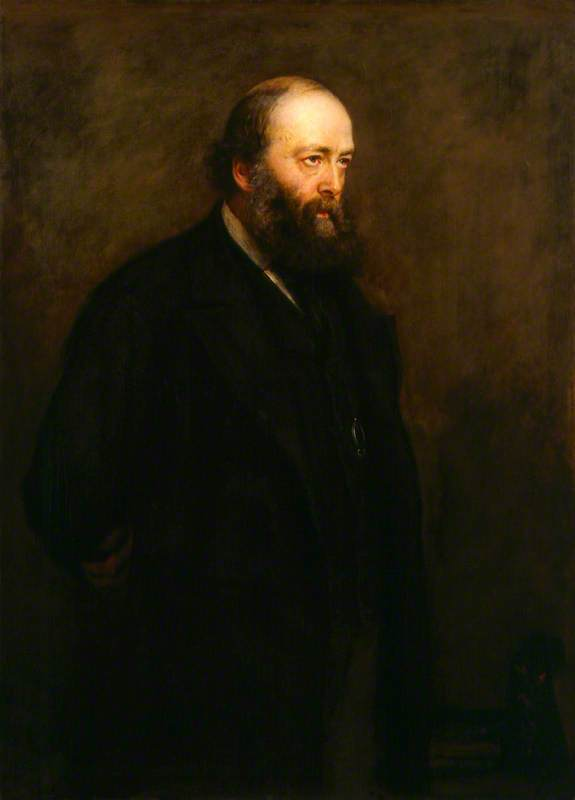
Portrait of the Marquess of Salisbury (1883)

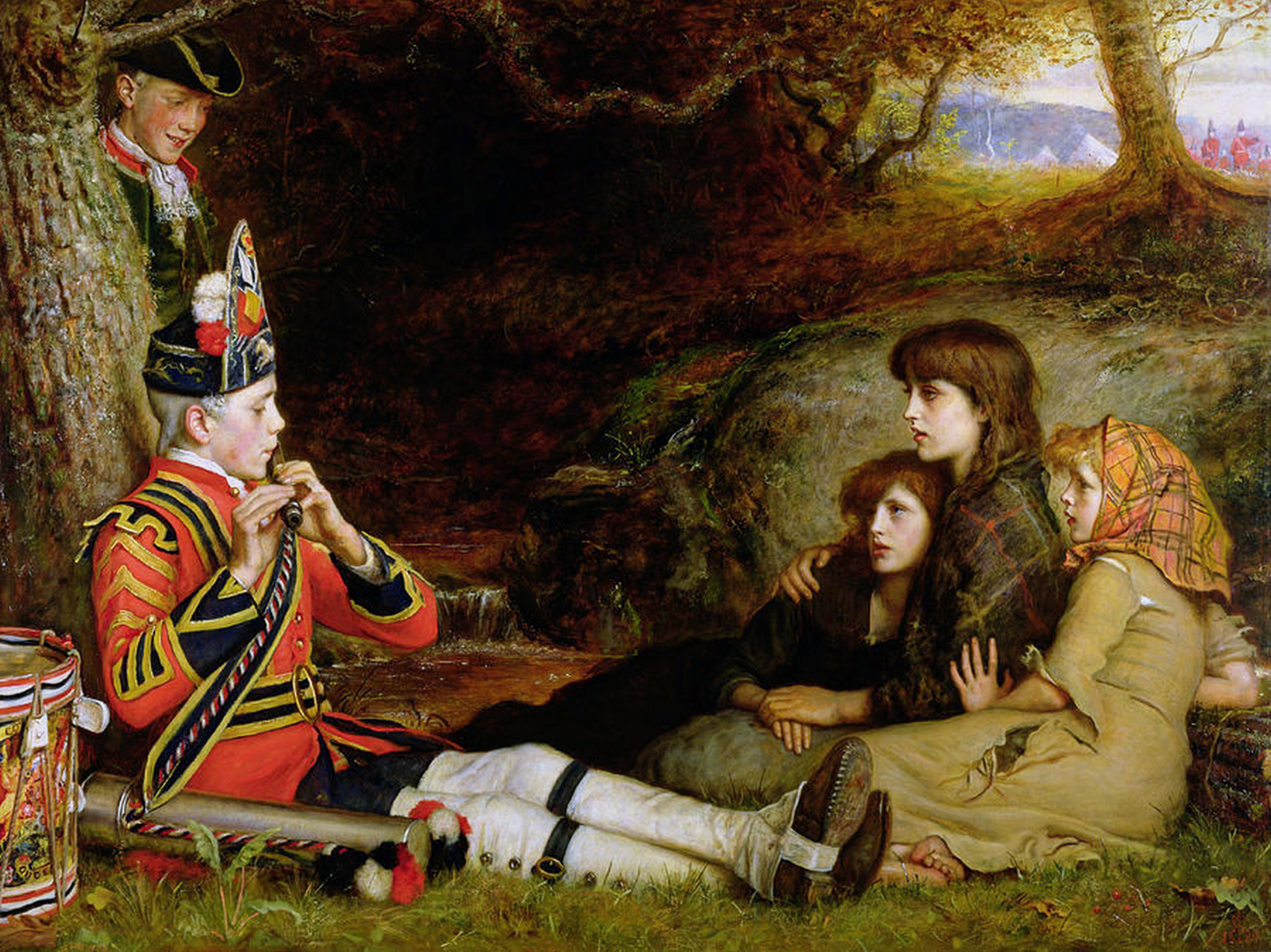
An Idyll of 1745 (1884). The three female artists models on the right were the sisters Lily Pettigrew (1870–1920); Hetty Pettigrew (1867–1953) and Rose Pettigrew (1872–1905)

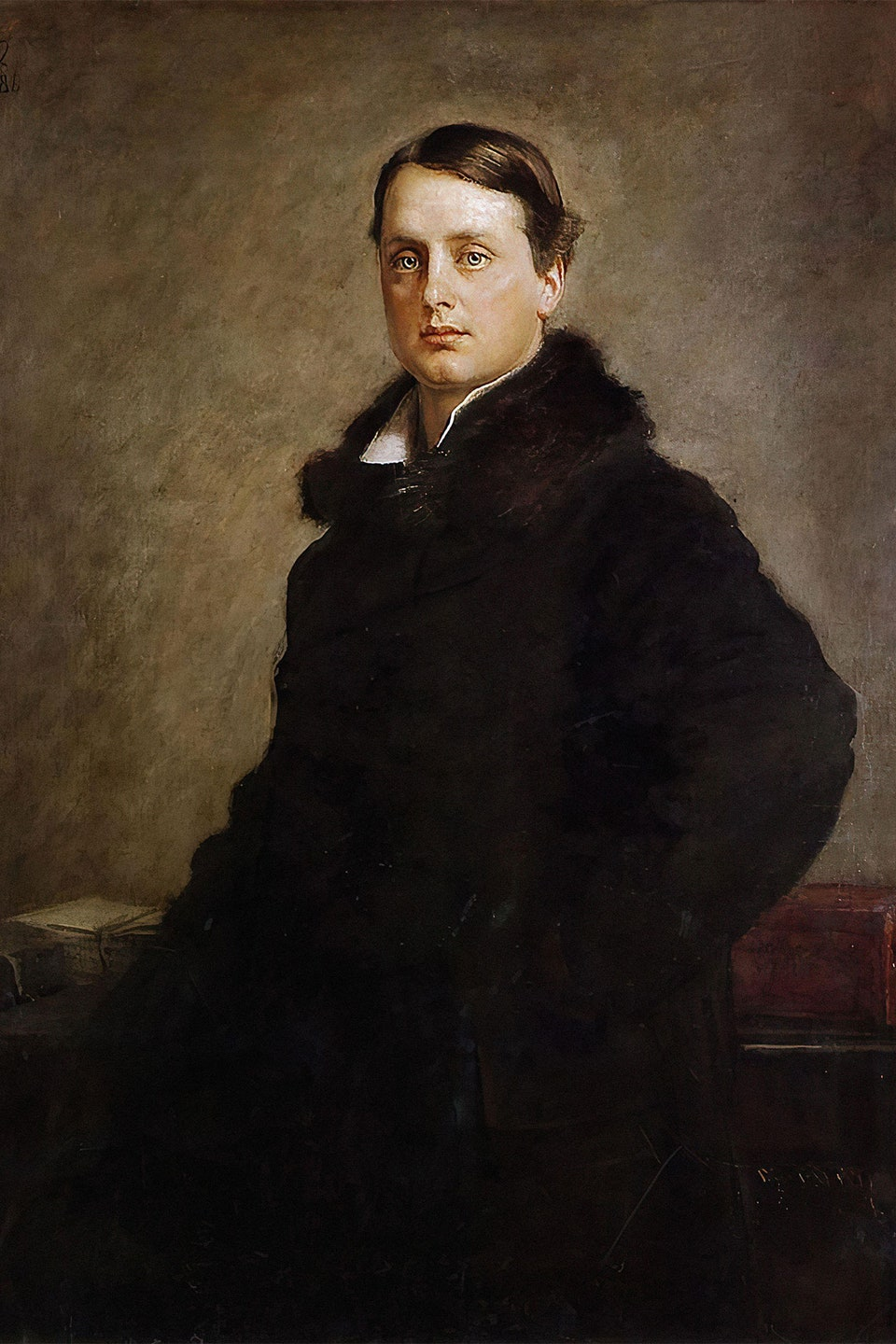
Earl of Rosebery (1886)

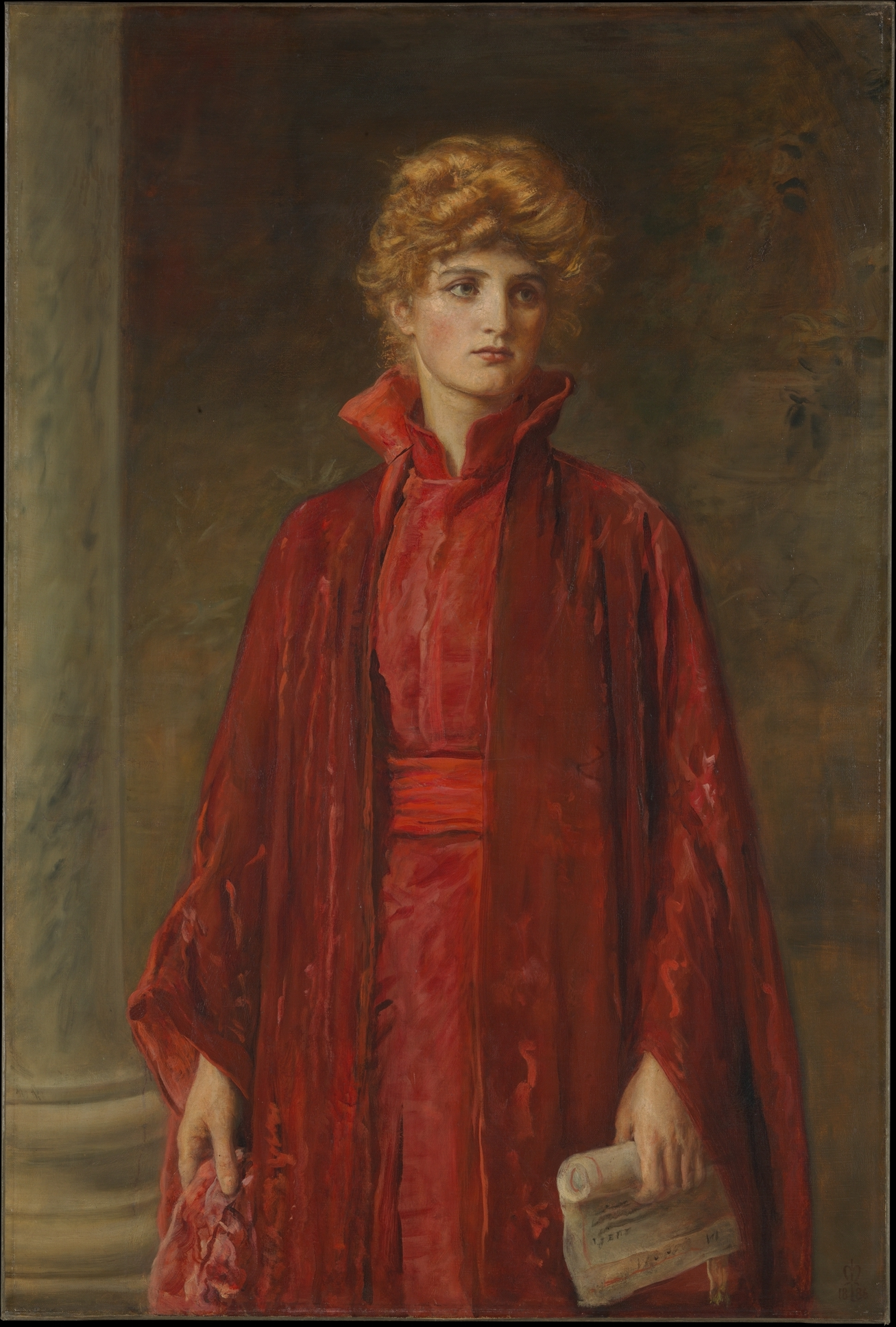
Portia (1886)

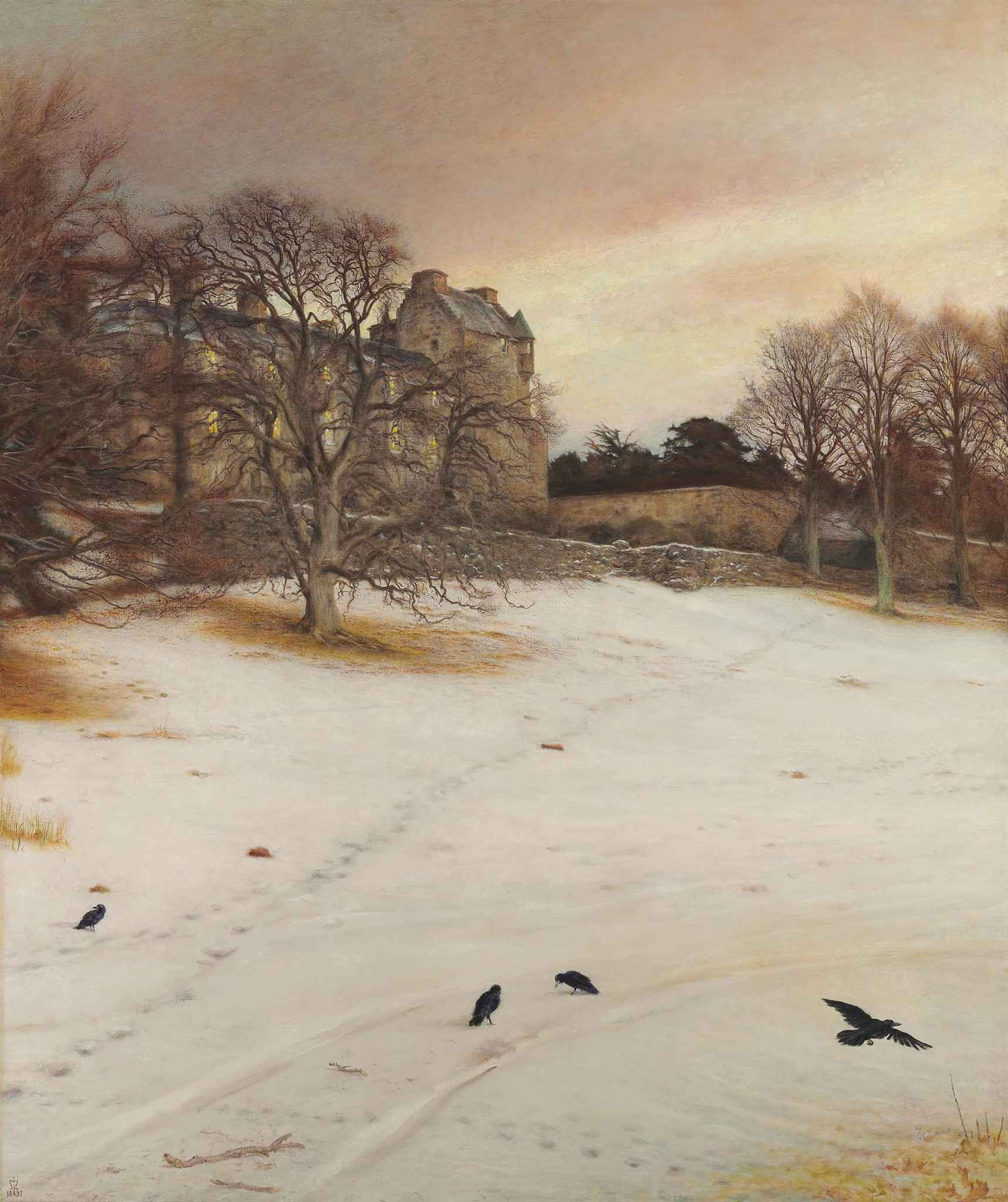
Christmas Eve (1887)

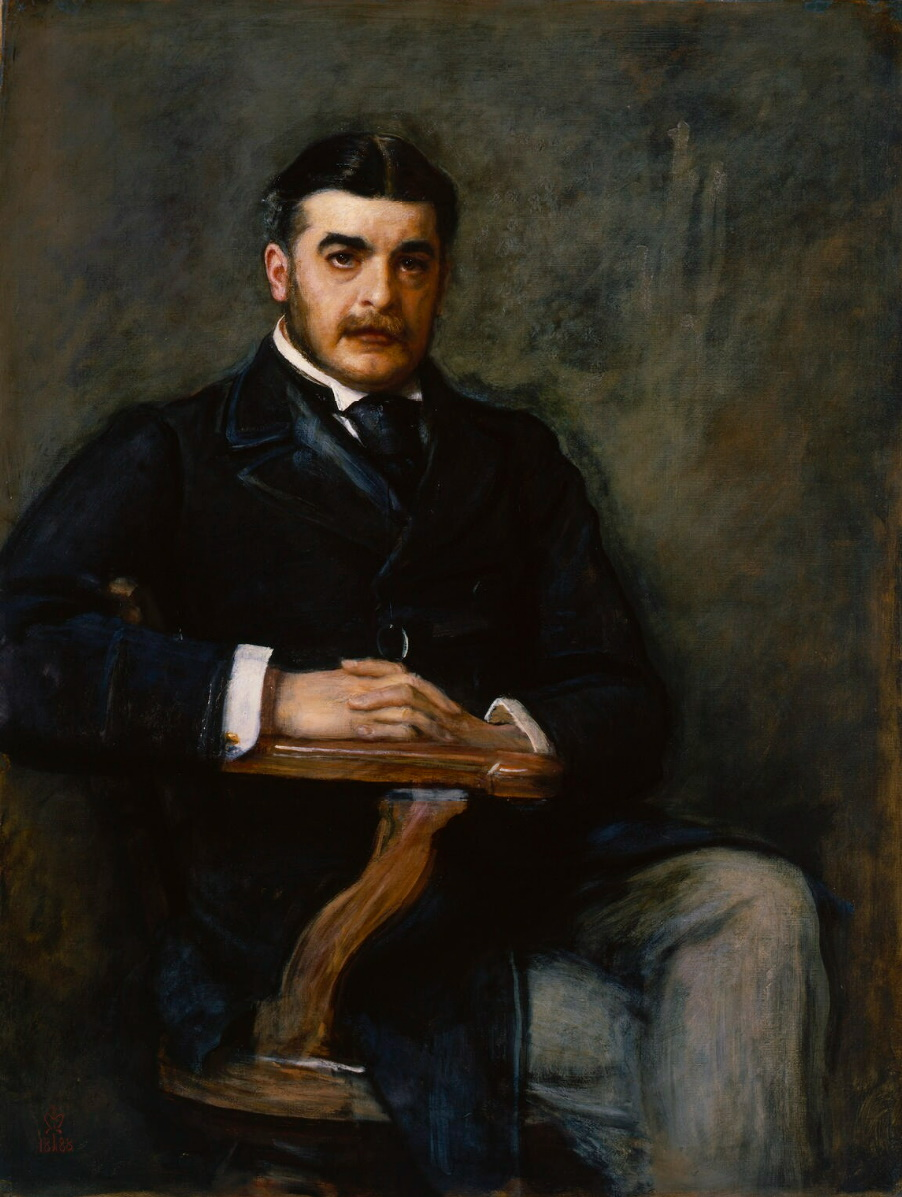
Portrait of Arthur Sullivan (1888)

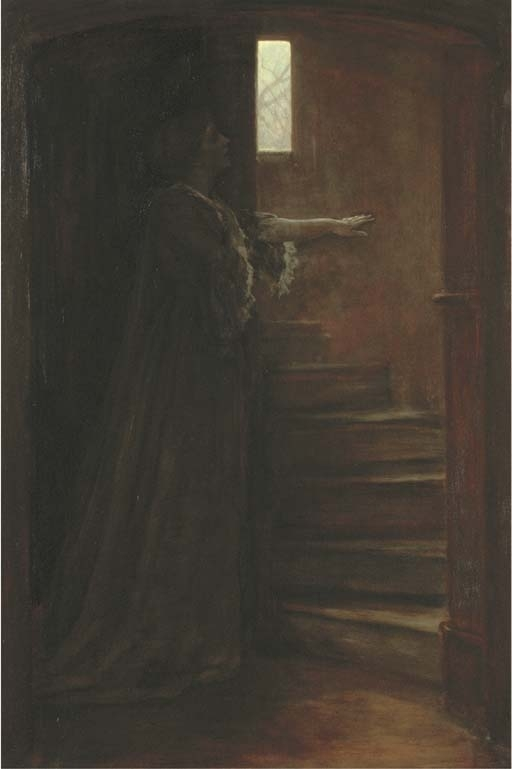
The Grey Lady (1888)
Private Collection

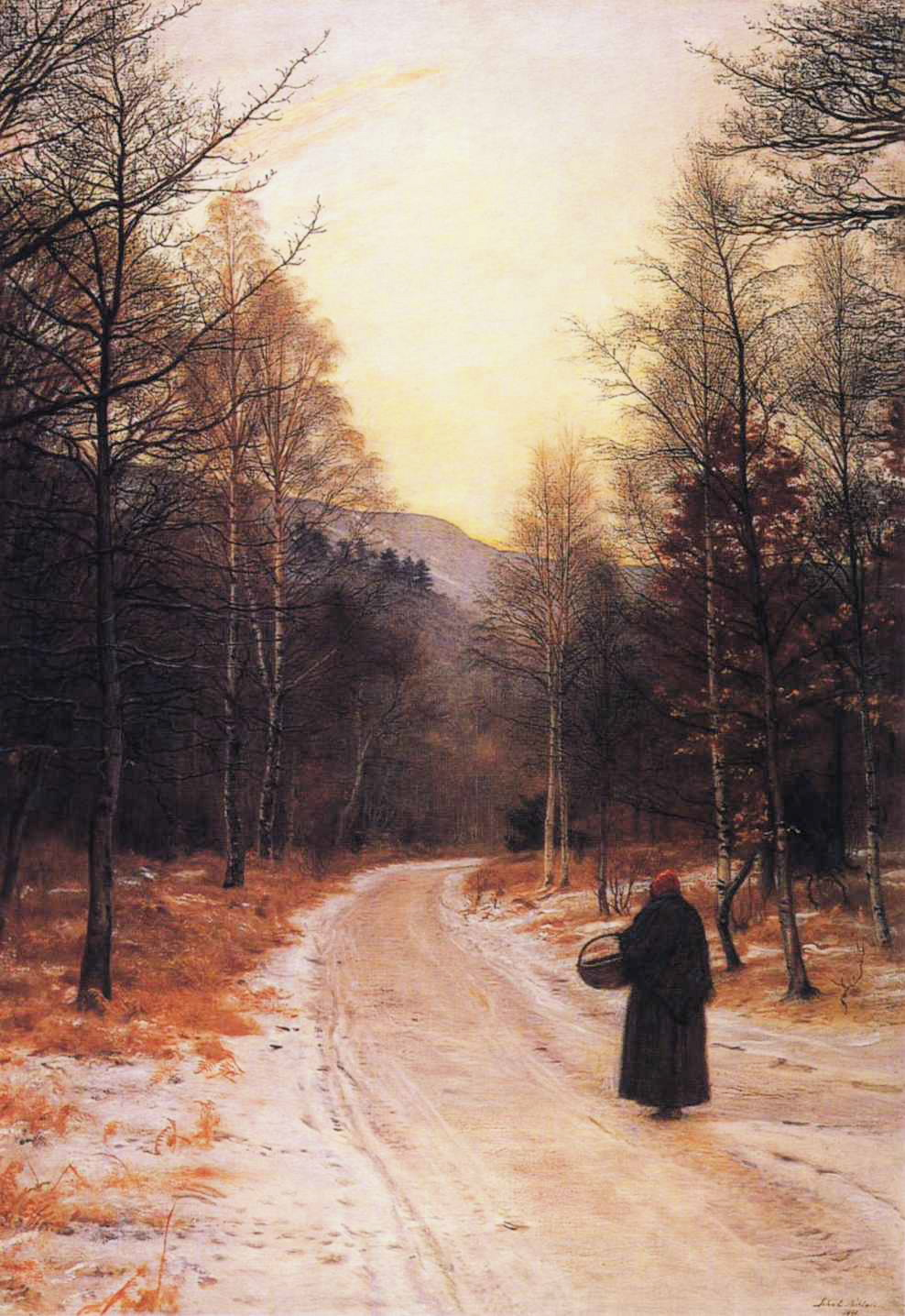
Glen Birnam (1891)

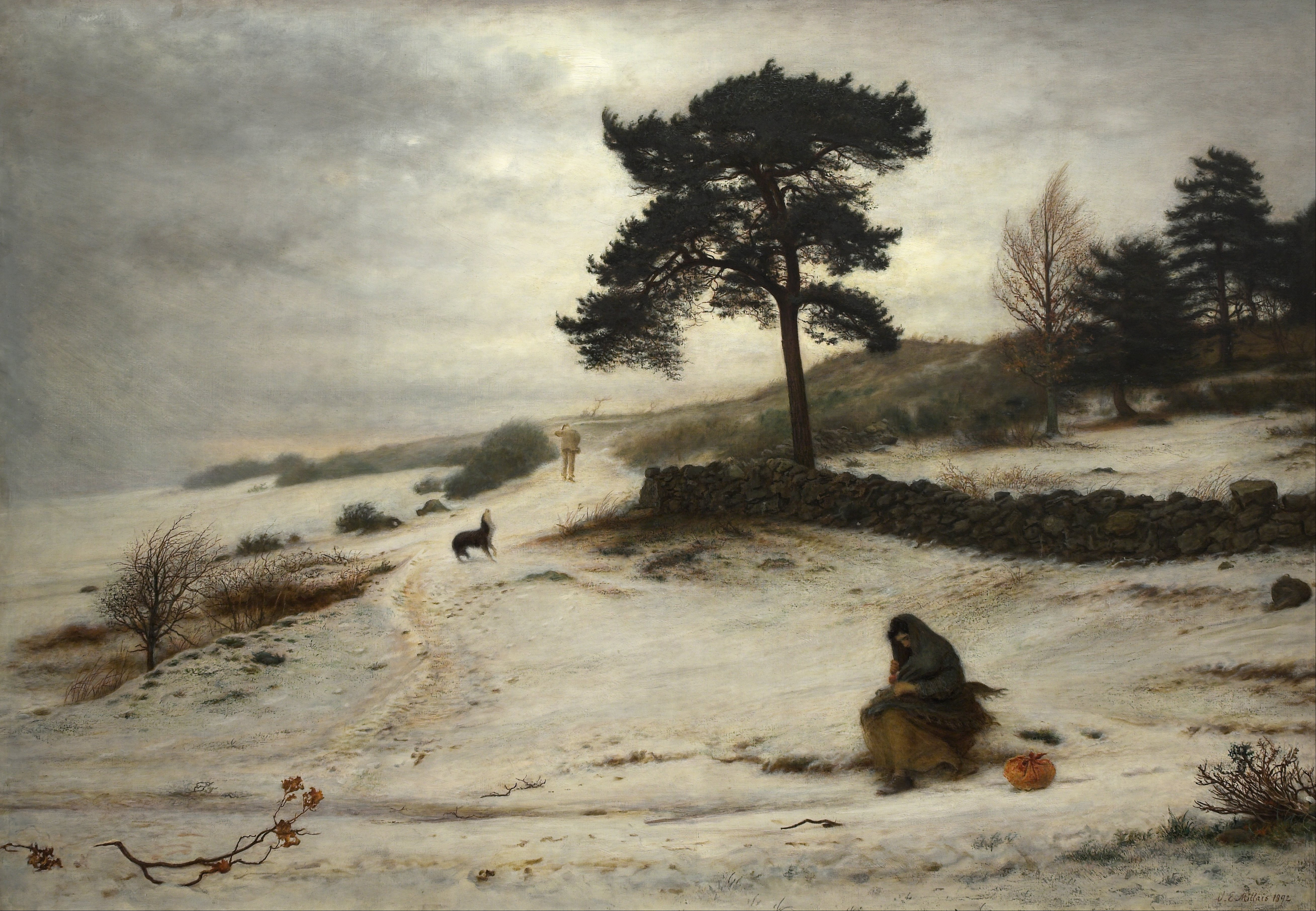
Blow, Blow, Thou Winter Wind (1892)

== See also ==
- List of paintings by John Everett Millais

== Notes and references ==
Cultural offices
Preceded by The Lord Leighton	President of the Royal Academy; 1896	Succeeded by Sir Edward Poynter
Baronetage of the United Kingdom
New creation	Baronet (of Palace Gate and St Ouen); 1885–1896	Succeeded by Everett Millais
