= List of paintings by John Everett Millais =

This is an incomplete list of paintings by the Pre-Raphaelite artist John Everett Millais (1829–1896). It focuses on oil paintings, with just a few watercolours listed; it includes a few notable oil sketches/studies. All dimensions are given in centimetres, in the form "height x width".

== Youthworks ==
- (1841) Cupid Crowned with Flowers. Oil on canvas, 58.4 cm x 45.7 cm.
- (c. 1843) Emily Millais. Oil on canvas, 59.7 cm × 49.5 cm. Private collection: Geoffroy Richard Everett Millais Collection, on long-term loan to Perth Art Gallery, Perth.
- (1846) Pizarro Seizing the Inca of Peru. Oil on canvas, 128.3 cm × 172.1 cm. Victoria & Albert Museum, London.
- (1847) Self Portrait. Oil on millboard, 27.3 cm × 22.2 cm. Walker Art Gallery, Liverpool.
- (c. 1847) The Artist Attending the Mourning of a Young Girl. Oil on board, 18.7 cm × 25.7 cm. Tate Gallery, London.
- (c. 1847) The Conjuror. Oil on canvas, 35.2 cm x 45.5 cm. Norwich Castle Museum, Norwich.
- (c. 1847) Infancy. Oil on canvas, 38.6 cm x 129.5 cm. Leeds Art Gallery, Leeds.
- (c. 1847) Youth. Oil on canvas, 38.6 cm x 129.5 cm. Temple Newsam, Leeds.
- (c. 1847) Manhood. Oil on canvas, 38.6 cm x 129.5 cm. Leeds Art Gallery, Leeds.
- (c. 1847) Old Age. Oil on canvas, 38.6 cm x 129.5 cm. Leeds Art Gallery, Leeds.
- (c. 1847) Music. Oil on canvas, 38.6 cm x 129.5 cm. Leeds Art Gallery, Leeds.
- (c. 1847) Poetry. Oil on canvas, 38.6 cm x 129.5 cm. Temple Newsam, Leeds.

== Pre-Raphaelite Brotherhood ==
- (1847–48) Cymon and Iphigenia. Oil on canvas, 114.3 cm × 147.3 cm. Lady Lever Art Gallery, Port Sunlight, Merseyside.
- (1848) Serjeant Ralph Thomas. Oil on wood, 40.7 cm x 30.3 cm. Tate Gallery, London.
- (1848) Portrait of Hugh Fenn or William Hugh Fenn or Portrait of W. Hugh Fenn. Oil on wood panel, 29.1 cm x 24.5 cm. Owens Art Gallery, Mount Allison University, Sackville, New Brunswick.
- (c. 1848) The Death of Romeo and Juliet. Oil on millboard, 16.1 cm x 26.9 cm. Manchester Art Gallery, Manchester.
- (c. 1848) Landscape, Hampstead or Hampstead Heath. Oil on panel, 23.1 cm x 33.6 cm. Sudley House, Liverpool.
- (1848–49) Isabella or Lorenzo and Isabella. Oil on canvas, 102.9 cm × 142.9 cm. Walker Art Gallery, Liverpool.
- (1849) Ferdinand Lured by Ariel. Oil on canvas study, oval, 14.6 cm x 10.9 cm. Sudley House, Liverpool. (Not to be confused with the 1849–50 painting of the same name)
- (1849) James Wyatt and his Granddaughter Mary or Portrait of a Gentleman and his Grandchild. Oil on panel, 35.6 cm x 45.1 cm. Private collection: Andrew Lloyd Webber Collection.
- (1849) Portrait of Four Children of the Wyatt Family. Oil on board, 45.5 cm x 30.5 cm. Private collection: Andrew Lloyd Webber Collection.
- (1849) The Kingfisher's Haunt. 24.5 cm x ? cm. Destroyed during World War 2.
- (1849–50) Christ in the House of His Parents or The Carpenter's Shop. Oil on canvas, 86.4 cm × 139.7 cm. Tate Britain, London.
- (1849–50) Ferdinand Lured by Ariel. Oil on canvas, 65 cm × 51 cm; 64.8 cm diameter. Private collection. (Not to be confused with the 1849 painting of the same name).
- (1850) Portrait of Wilkie Collins. Oil on panel, 26.7 cm × 17.8 cm. National Portrait Gallery, London.
- (1850) Thomas Combe. Oil on panel, 33 cm x 27 cm. Ashmolean Museum, Oxford.
- (c. 1850) Mrs James Wyatt Jr and her Daughter Sarah. Oil on mahogany, 35.3 cm x 45.7 cm. Tate Gallery, London.
- (1850–51) The Woodman's Daughter. Oil on canvas, 89 cm × 65 cm. Guildhall Art Gallery, London.
- (1851) Mariana or Mariana in the Moated Grange. Oil on mahogany panel, 59.7 cm × 49.5 cm. Tate Britain, London.
- (1851) The Return of the Dove to the Ark. Oil on canvas, 88.2 × 54.9 cm. Ashmolean Museum, Oxford.
- (1851) The Bridesmaid. Oil on canvas, 27.9 cm × 20.3 cm. Fitzwilliam Museum, Cambridge. (Not be confused with Millais' 1879 portrait with the same name.)
- (1851) Mrs Coventry Patmore or Portrait of Mrs Coventry K. Patmore or Emily Augusta Patmore, née Andrews (1824–1862). Oil on panel, 19.7 cm x 20.3 cm. Fitzwilliam Museum, Cambridge.
- (1851–52) A Huguenot, on St Bartholomew's Day, refusing to shield himself from danger by wearing the Roman Catholic badge or The Huguenot. Oil on canvas, 92.7 cm × 64.1 cm. Private collection: The Makins Collection.
- (1851–52) Ophelia. Oil on canvas, 76.2 cm × 111.8 cm. Tate Britain, London.
- (1852) Memory. Oil on panel, 30.5 cm x 25.4 cm.
- (1852–53) The Order of Release, 1746. Oil on canvas, 102.9 cm × 73.7 cm. Tate Britain, London.
- (1852–53) The Proscribed Royalist, 1651. Oil on canvas, 102.8 cm × 73.6 cm. Private collection: Andrew Lloyd Webber Collection.
- (1853) The Waterfall or A Waterfall at Glenfinlas or Effie at Glenfinlas. Oil on canvas, 33.3 cm x 23.2 cm. Delaware Art Museum, Wilmington, Delaware.
- (1853) Effie with Foxgloves in Her Hair or Euphemia 'Effie' Chalmers Gray, Mrs John Ruskin (1828–1898), later Lady Millais, with Foxgloves in her Hair or The Foxglove. Oil on millboard, 37.3 cm x 35.1 cm. National Trust: Wightwick Manor, Wolverhampton.
- (1853–54) John Ruskin or Portrait of John Ruskin, Esq.. Oil on canvas, 78.7 cm × 68 cm. Ashmolean Museum, Oxford.

== Associate member of the Royal Academy of Arts (A.R.A.), elected 7 November 1853 ==
- (1854) The Highland Lassie or Head of a Scotch Girl. Oil on board, 21.6 cm x 17.1 cm. Delaware Art Museum, Wilmington, Delaware.
- (1854) Waiting or Girl at the Stile or A Girl at a Stile or The Stile. Oil on panel, 32.4 cm x 25 cm. Birmingham Museums Trust, Birmingham.
- (1854) The Violet's Message or A Girl with Violets. Oil on panel, 25.4 cm x 19.7 cm. Private collection.
- (1854) Annie Miller. Oil on panel, 22.7 cm x 14.9 cm. Private collection: Harry Oppenheimer Collection.
- (1854) The Wedding Cards or Wedding Cards: Jilted. Oil on panel, 22.2 cm x 16.5 cm. Private collection.
- (c. 1854) Wandering Thoughts. Oil on canvas, 35.2 cm x 24.9 cm. Manchester City Art Gallery, Manchester.
- (1854–55) L'Enfant du Régiment or A Random Shot. Oil on paper laid on canvas and board, 61 cm x 45.1 cm. Yale Center for British Art, New Haven, Connecticut.
- (1855) The Rescue. Oil on canvas, 121.5 cm × 83.6 cm. National Gallery of Victoria, Melbourne.
- (1855–56) Autumn Leaves. Oil on canvas, 104 cm × 74 cm. Manchester City Art Gallery, Manchester.
- (1856) The Blind Girl. Oil on canvas, 83 cm × 62 cm. Birmingham Museum & Art Gallery, Birmingham.
- (1856) Peace Concluded, 1856, or Conclusion of Peace, 1856. Oil on canvas, 120 cm × 91 cm. Minneapolis Institute of Arts, Minneapolis.
- (1856) News from Home. Oil on panel, 35.5 cm x 25 cm. Walters Art Museum, Baltimore, Maryland.
- (1856) Pot Pourri. Oil on canvas, 44.5 cm x 35.6 cm. Private collection.
- (1856–57) A Dream of the Past: Sir Isumbras at the Ford. Oil on canvas, 120 cm × 170 cm. Lady Lever Art Gallery, Port Sunlight, Merseyside.
- (1856–57) The Escape of a Heretic, 1559. Oil on canvas, 109.5 cm x 79.1cm. Museo de Arte de Ponce, Ponce.
- (1857) Sophie Gray or Head of a Girl or Portrait of a Girl or Portrait of a Young Lady. Oil on paper laid over panel, 30 cm x 23 cm. Private collection.
- (1857) Alice Gray or Head of a Girl. Oil on canvas, 30.5 cm x 20.3 cm. (Sitter Alice Gray wears a jewelled cap, not to be confused with Head of a Girl, sitter Sophie Gray, also 1857). Private collection.
- (1857–58) Only a Lock of Hair. Oil on panel, 35.3 cm x 25 cm. Manchester City Art Gallery, Manchester.
- (1858–59) The Vale of Rest. Oil on canvas, 102.9 cm × 172.7 cm. Tate Britain, London.
- (1858–59) The Love of James the First, of Scotland. Oil on canvas, 104.1 cm x 53.3 cm. Private collection.
- (1856–59) Spring or Apple Blossoms. Oil on canvas, 176.3 cm x 113 cm. Lady Lever Art Gallery, Port Sunlight, Merseyside.
- (1859) Meditation. King’s College, Cambridge.
- (1860) The Black Brunswicker. Oil on canvas, 104 cm × 68.5 cm. Lady Lever Art Gallery, Port Sunlight, Merseyside.
- (1860) The Rivals
- (c. 1860) Parable - The Leaven. Watercolour on paper, 13.6 cm × 10.7 cm. Aberdeen Art Gallery, Aberdeen.
- (c. 1860) Parable - The Hidden Treasure. Watercolour on paper, 13.6 cm × 10.9 cm. Aberdeen Art Gallery, Aberdeen.
- (c. 1860) Parable - The Pharisee and the Publican. Watercolour on paper, 13.8 cm × 10.7 cm. Aberdeen Art Gallery, Aberdeen.
- (1860–62) The Ransom or The Hostage. Oil on canvas, 134 cm × 115.9 cm. Getty Center, Los Angeles, California.
- (1860–62) Trust Me. Oil on canvas, 111.7 cm x 77.4 cm. Private collection.
- (1862) Mrs Charles Freeman. Oil on panel, 35.5 cm x 22.5 cm. Private collection.
- (1862) The White Cockade. Oil on canvas, 61 cm x 45.1 cm. Delaware Art Museum, Wilmington, Delaware.
- (1862) The Bride (passion flowers in her hair; bought by B G Windus.)
- (1862–63) The Wolf's Den. Oil on canvas, 83.8 cm x 114.3 cm. National Museum of Western Art, Tokyo.
- (1863) The Eve of St Agnes. Oil on canvas, 118.1 cm × 154.9 cm. Royal Collection.
- (1863) My First Sermon. Oil on canvas, 97 cm × 77 cm. Guildhall Art Gallery, London.
- (1863) Portrait of Henry Manners (now Marquess of Granby). Oil on canvas, 35.5 cm x 29.5 cm. Southwark Heritage Centre, London.
- (1863) Suspense
- (1863) The Bridesmaid throwing the Lucky Slipper
- (c. 1863) Milking Time or The Farmer's Daughter or The Milkmaid or Girl in Cornfield (Miss Ford). Oil on canvas, 45.8 cm x 35.3 cm.

== Member of the Royal Academy of Arts (R.A.), elected 18 December 1863 ==
- (1863–64) Lily Noble or Lily, Daughter of John Noble or Portrait of Lily, Daughter of J. Noble, Esq.. Oil on canvas, 90.2 cm x 69.9 cm.
- (1864) "Charlie Is My Darling". Oil on canvas, 109 cm × 68.5 cm. Private collection.
- (1864) My Second Sermon. Oil on canvas. 97 cm x 72 cm. Guildhall Art Gallery, London.
- (1864) Harold Heneage Finch-Hatton or Portrait of Harold, Son of the Dowager Countess of Winchilsea. Oil on panel, 28 cm x 23 cm (oval).
- (1864) Leisure Hours. Oil on canvas, 118.1 cm x 88.9 cm. Detroit Institute of Arts, Detroit.
- (1864) A Portrait of John Wycliffe Taylor at the Age of Five. Oil on panel, 35.5 cm x 26.5 cm.
- (1864) "Swallow! Swallow!". Oil on canvas, 99.1 cm x 73.7 cm.
- (1865) Joan of Arc. Oil on canvas, 82 cm x 62 cm. Private collection. Joan of Arc
- (1865) Esther. Oil on canvas, 106 cm × 77.4 cm. Private collection.
- (1865) The Parable of the Tares or The Enemy Sowing Tares. Oil on canvas, 111.8 cm x 86 cm. Birmingham Museums Trust, Birmingham.
- (1865) The Romans Leaving Britain. Oil on canvas, 121.9 cm x 190.5 cm.
- (1865–66) Master Cayley or Hugh Cayley of Wydale
- (1865–67) Asleep or Sleeping. Oil on canvas, 89 cm x 68.5 cm. Private collection.
- (1865–67) Just Awake or Waking. Oil on canvas, 87 cm x 67 cm. Perth Art Gallery, Perthshire.
- (1866) The Minuet. Watercolour on canvas, 25.5 cm x 10 cm.
- (1867) Jephthah. Oil on canvas, 162.7 cm x 127 cm. National Museum Cardiff, Cardiff.
- (c. 1867–68) Rosalind in the Forest. Oil on board, 22.6 cm x 32.7 cm. Walker Art Gallery, Liverpool.
- (1868) Sisters. Oil on canvas, 108 cm x 108 cm.
- (1868) A Souvenir of Velasquez or Souvenir of Velasquez. Oil on canvas, 102.7 cm × 82.4 cm. Royal Academy of Arts, London.
- (1868) Vanessa. Oil on canvas, 112.7 cm x 91.5 cm. Sudley House, Liverpool.
- (1868) Stella. Oil on canvas, 112.7 cm x 92.1 cm. Manchester Art Gallery, Manchester.
- (1868) Portrait of Sir John Fowler, Bart. Oil on canvas, 124.5 cm x 99.1 cm.
- (1868) Rosalind and Celia. Oil on canvas, 116.8 cm x 160 cm.
- (1868) Greenwich Pensioners at the Tomb of Nelson or Pilgrims to St Paul's. Oil on canvas, 142.2 cm x 109.2 cm.
- (1869) The Gambler's Wife. Oil on canvas, 86.4 cm x 38.1 cm.
- (1869) Portrait of Nina, Daughter of Frederick Lehmann, Esq.. Oil on canvas, 132.1 cm x 88.9 cm. Private collection.
- (1870) The Boyhood of Raleigh. Oil on canvas, 120.6 cm × 142.2 cm. Tate Gallery, London.
- (1870) The Marchioness of Huntly or Amy, Marchioness of Huntly. Oil on canvas, 223.5 cm x 132 cm.
- (1870) Chill October. Oil on canvas, 141.0 cm × 186.7 cm. Private collection: Andrew Lloyd Webber Collection.
- (1870) A Flood. Oil on canvas, 144.9 cm x 99.3 cm. Manchester Art Gallery, Manchester.
- (1870) The Knight Errant. Oil on canvas, 184.1 cm × 135.3 cm. Tate Britain, London.
- (1870) A Widow's Mite. Oil on canvas, 131.5 cm x 92.4 cm. Birmingham Museums Trust, Birmingham.
- (1870) Portrait of Sir John Kelk, Bart.. Oil on canvas, 127 cm x 99.1 cm.
- (1871) The Martyr of the Solway. Oil on canvas, 70.5 cm × 56.5 cm. Walker Art Gallery, Liverpool.
- (1871) Victory O Lord!. Oil on canvas, 194.7 cm × 141.3 cm. Manchester Art Gallery, Manchester.
- (1871) A Somnambulist. Oil on canvas, 154 cm x 91 cm. Delaware Art Museum, Wilmington, Delaware.
- (1871) Flowing to the River. Oil on canvas, 188 cm x 139.7 cm. The Capricorn Foundation, on long-term loan to Tate Gallery, London.
- (1871) Flowing to the Sea. Oil on canvas, 188 cm x 143 cm. Southampton City Art Gallery, Southampton.
- (1871) Charles Lyon Liddell or The Brown Boy or The Boy in the Brown Suit. Oil on canvas, 161.3 cm x 105.4 cm.
- (1871) "Yes or No?". Oil on canvas, 111.8 cm × 91.4 cm. Yale University Art Gallery, New Haven, Connecticut.
- (1871) Portrait of George Grote, Esq.. Oil on canvas, 124.5 cm x 99.1 cm.
- (1872) Oh! that a dream so sweet, so long enjoy'd, Should be so sadly, cruelly destroy'd. Oil on canvas, 127 cm x 83.9 cm. Private collection.
- (1872) Hearts are Trumps or Portraits of Elizabeth, Diana, and Mary, Daughters of the Late Walter Armstrong, Esq.. Oil on canvas, 219.7 cm x 165.7 cm. Tate Gallery, London.
- (1872) Isabella Heugh or Portrait of Mrs Heugh. Oil on canvas, 119.4 cm x 101.6 cm.
- (1872) Portrait of Sir James Paget, Bart.. Oil on canvas, 124.5 cm x 99.1 cm.
- (1873) Portrait of Mrs Bischoffsheim. Oil on canvas, 136.4 cm x 91.8 cm. Tate Gallery, London.
- (1873) Portrait of Effie Millais. Oil on canvas, 99 cm × 84 cm. Perth Art Gallery, Perthshire.
- (1873) Scotch Firs. Oil on canvas, 185.4 cm x 139.7 cm. Private collection
- (1873) Winter Fuel. Oil on canvas, 194.5 cm x 149.5 cm. Manchester Art Gallery, Manchester.
- (1873) New-Laid Eggs. Oil on canvas, 121.9 cm x 88.9 cm.
- (1873) Early Days. Oil on canvas, 113.7 cm x 94.6 cm.
- (1873) Portrait of the Hon. Walter Rothschild. Oil on canvas, 142.2 cm x 94 cm.
- (1873) Portrait of Sir William Sterndale Bennett. Oil on canvas, 124.5 cm x 99.1 cm.
- (1874) The North-West Passage. Oil on canvas, 176.5 cm × 222.2 cm. Tate Britain, London.
- (1874) The Fringe of the Moor. Oil on canvas, 134.6 cm x 215.9 cm. Johannesburg Art Gallery, Johannesburg.
- (1874) Day Dreams. Oil on canvas, 89.1 cm x 69 cm. The Dick Institute, Kilmarnock, East Ayrshire.
- (1874) The Picture of Health. Oil on canvas, 110.5 cm x 86.4 cm.
- (1874) Miss Eveleen Tennant. Oil on canvas, 106.7 cm x 78.7 cm.
- (1875) The Deserted Garden. Oil on canvas, 121.9 cm x 182.9 cm.
- (1875) "Over the Hills and Far Away". Oil on canvas, 132.1 cm x 188 cm.
- (1875) The Crown of Love. Oil on canvas, 129.5 cm x 87.8 cm. Private collection: Pérez Simón Collection
- (1875) Forbidden Fruit. Oil on canvas, 73.7 cm x 58.4 cm.
- (1875) Portrait of Eveline, Daughter of T. Evans Lees, Esq.. Oil on canvas, 106.7 cm x 73.7 cm.
- (1875) Portrait of Gracia, Daughter of T. Evans Lees, Esq.. Oil on canvas, 106.7 cm x 76.2 cm.
- (1875) "No!". Oil on canvas, 119.4 cm x 81.3 cm.
- (1875) James Wyatt Junior (b. 1812), Aged 65. Oil on canvas, 73.5 cm x 61 cm. Oxford Town Hall, Oxford.
- (c. 1875) Dead Pheasants. Oil on panel, 30.5 cm x 20.3 cm.
- (1876) George Gray Millais or Portrait of George Millais, Esq.. Oil on canvas, oval portrait. Private collection: Geoffroy Richard Everett Millais Collection, on long-term loan to Perth Art Gallery, Perth.
- (1876) Everett Millais or Portrait of Everett Millais, Esq.. Oil on canvas, oval portrait. Private collection: Geoffroy Richard Everett Millais Collection, on long-term loan to Perth Art Gallery, Perth.
- (1876) Effie Millais or Portrait of Miss Effie Millais (now Mrs James). Oil on canvas, oval portrait. Private collection: Geoffroy Richard Everett Millais Collection, on long-term loan to Perth Art Gallery, Perth.
- (1876) Mary Millais or Portrait of Miss Mary Millais. Oil on canvas, oval portrait. Private collection: Geoffroy Richard Everett Millais Collection, on long-term loan to Perth Art Gallery, Perth
- (1876) Alice Millais or Portrait of Miss Alice Caroline Millais (now Mrs Stuart Wortley). Oil on canvas, oval portrait. Private collection: Geoffroy Richard Everett Millais Collection, on long-term loan to Perth Art Gallery, Perth
- (1876) The Sound of Many Waters. Oil on canvas, 57.5 cm × 107.8 cm. Fyvie Castle, Aberdeenshire.
- (1876) The Twins or Portraits of the Twin Daughters of Thomas Rolls Hoare, Esq.. Oil on canvas, 153.5 cm × 113.7 cm. Fitzwilliam Museum, Cambridge.
- (1876) The Yeoman of the Guard or A Yeoman of the Guard. Oil on canvas, 139.7 cm × 111.8 cm. Tate Britain, London.
- (1876) Lord Ronald Gower. Oil on canvas, 61 cm x 45.7 cm. Royal Shakespeare Company Collection.
- (1876) Edward Robert Bulwer Lytton (1831–1891), 1st Earl Lytton. Oil on canvas, 114.3 cm x 74.3 cm. Victoria and Albert Museum, London.
- (1876) "Stitch, Stitch, Stitch!". Oil on canvas, 73.7 cm x 61 cm.
- (1876) Portrait of a Lady. Oil on canvas, 114.3 cm x 73.7 cm.
- (1876) Getting Better. Oil on canvas, 101.6 cm x 87.6 cm.
- (1877) Thomas Carlyle. Oil on canvas, 116.8 cm x 88.3 cm. National Portrait Gallery, London.
- (1877) Bright Eyes. Oil on canvas, 92 cm x 71.5 cm. Aberdeen Art Gallery, Aberdeen.
- (1877) The Good Resolve or A Good Resolve. Oil on canvas, 110 cm x 82.2 cm. Walker Art Gallery, Liverpool.
- (1877) "Yes!". Oil on canvas, 149.8 cm x 116.8 cm. Private collection: Andrew Lloyd Webber Collection.
- (1877) Puss-in-Boots. Oil on canvas, 106.7 cm x 79.3 cm. The McManus, Dundee.
- (1877) Effie Deans. Oil on canvas, 144.8 cm x 106.7 cm.
- (1877) Portrait of the Earl of Shaftesbury, K.G.. Oil on canvas, 128.3 cm x 101.6 cm.
- (1878) A Jersey Lily. Oil on canvas, 109 cm × 85 cm. Jersey Museum and Art Gallery, Saint Helier.
- (1878) The Princes in the Tower or The Two Princes Edward and Richard in the Tower, 1483. Oil on canvas, 147.2 cm x 91.4 cm. Royal Holloway Collection, London.
- (1878) St Martin's Summer. Oil on canvas, 151 cm × 107 cm. Montreal Museum of Fine Arts, Montreal, Quebec.
- (1878) Portrait of Mrs Stibbard. Oil on canvas, 106.7 cm x 68.6 cm.
- (1878) The Bride of Lammermoor.
- (1879) Urquhart Castle, on Loch Ness. Oil on canvas, 135 cm x 91.5 cm. Private collection: Geoffroy Richard Everett Millais Collection, on long-term loan to Perth Art Gallery, Perth.
- (1879) Cherry Ripe. Oil on canvas, 134.5 cm x 89 cm. Private collection.
- (1879) Princess Elizabeth in Prison at St James's. Oil on canvas, 144.7 cm × 101.5 cm. Royal Holloway Collection, London.
- (1879) Portrait of Louise Jopling or Portrait of Mrs Jopling. Oil on canvas, 124 cm × 76.5 cm. National Portrait Gallery, London.
- (1879) Portrait of William Ewart Gladstone or Portrait of The Rt. Hon. W. E. Gladstone. Oil on canvas, 125.7 cm × 91.4 cm. National Portrait Gallery, London.
- (1879) Meditation. Oil on canvas, 91.5 cm x 61.4 cm. Shipley Art Gallery, Gateshead, Tyne and Wear.
- (1879) Portrait of Miss Beatrice Caird. Oil on canvas, oval, 55.8 cm x 43.2 cm.
- (1879) Portrait of Miss Hermione Schenley. Oil on canvas, 137.2 cm x 96.5 cm.
- (1879) The Bridesmaid. Oil on canvas, 58.4 cm x 43.2 cm. (Not be confused with Millais' 1851 portrait with the same name.)
- (1879) Portrait of Mrs S. H. Beddington. Oil on canvas, 127 cm x 101.6 cm.
- (1880) Portrait of the Painter or Self Portrait. Oil on canvas, 86 cm x 65 cm. Uffizi Gallery, Florence.
- (1880) Portrait of Mrs Kate Perugini or Portrait of Mrs Perugini. Oil on canvas, 124.5 cm x 78.7 cm.
- (1880) Portrait of Mrs Caird. Oil on canvas, 127 cm x 78.7 cm.
- (1880) Portrait of Miss Alcyone Stepney. Oil on canvas, 121.9 cm x 76.2 cm.
- (1880) Portrait of Bishop Fraser. Oil on canvas, 125.7 cm x 91.4 cm.
- (1880) Diana Vernon. Oil on canvas, 124.5 cm x 94 cm.
- (1880) Portrait of The Right Hon. John Bright. Oil on canvas, 125.7 cm x 91.4 cm.
- (1880) "Cuckoo!". Oil on canvas, Oil on canvas, 127 cm x 99.1 cm.
- (1880) Portrait of Luther Holden, Esq.. Oil on canvas, 127 cm x 91.4 cm.
- (c. 1880) Reverend John Caird (1820–1898), Principal of Glasgow University (1873–1898). Oil on canvas, 127 cm x 91.4 cm. Glasgow Museums Resource Centre (GMRC), Glasgow.
- (1881) Benjamin Disraeli, The Earl of Beaconsfield, K.G.. Oil on canvas, 127.6 cm × 93.1 cm. National Portrait Gallery, London.
- (1881) Portrait of Alfred Tennyson or Portrait of Alfred, First Lord Tennyson. Oil on canvas, 127 cm × 93 cm. Lady Lever Art Gallery, Port Sunlight, Merseyside.
- (1881) Portrait of Cardinal John Newman or Portrait of Cardinal Newman. Oil on canvas, 121.3 cm x 95.3 cm. National Portrait Gallery, London; on display at Arundel Castle, Arundel.
- (1881) Cinderella. Oil on canvas, 127 cm x 88.9 cm. Private collection: Andrew Lloyd Webber Collection.
- (1881) "Sweetest Eyes Were Ever Seen". Oil on canvas, 100.5 cm x 72 cm. National Galleries of Scotland.
- (1881) Sir Henry Thompson or Portrait of Sir Henry Thomson, F.R.C.S.. Oil on canvas, 125.7 cm x 914 cm. Tate Britain, London.
- (1881) Portrait of Daniel Thwaites, Esq.. Oil on canvas, 125.7 cm x 91.4 cm.
- (1881) The Children of Octavius Moulton Barrett, Esq.. Oil on canvas, 124.5 cm x 99.1 cm.
- (1881) Portrait of Sir John D. Astley, Bart.. Oil on canvas, 124.5 cm x 91.4 cm.
- (1881) Little Mrs Gamp. Oil on canvas, 111.8 cm x 81.3 cm.
- (1881) Caller Herrin'. Oil on canvas, 110.5 cm x 78.7 cm. Private collection.
- (1882) The Captive or Ruby. Oil on canvas, 115.6 cm x 77.2 cm. Art Gallery of New South Wales, Sydney.
- (1882) The Stowaway. Oil on canvas, 114.3 cm x 81.3 cm.
- (1882) Pomona. Oil on canvas, 101.6 cm x 73.7 cm.
- (1882) Portrait of Mrs James Stern. Oil on canvas, 124.5 cm x 81.3 cm.
- (1882) Olivia. Oil on canvas, 99.1 cm x 71.1 cm. Now lost.
- (1882) Portrait of the Duchess of Westminster. Oil on canvas, 121.9 cm x 81.9 cm.
- (1882) "For the Squire". Oil on canvas, 83.8 cm x 63.5 cm.
- (1882) Portrait of J. C. Hook, Esq., R.A.. Oil on canvas, 127 cm x 91.4 cm.
- (1882) Portrait of H.R.H The Princess Marie of Edinburgh. Oil on canvas, 90.2 cm x 62.2 cm.
- (1883) Portrait of the Marquess of Salisbury or Portrait of the Marquess of Salisbury, K.G.. Oil on canvas, 127.3 cm × 93.3 cm. National Portrait Gallery, London.
- (1883) Self Portrait. Oil on canvas, 34.5 cm x 29.7 cm. Aberdeen Art Gallery, Aberdeen.
- (1883) Fallen from the Nest. Oil on canvas, 101.6 cm x 68.6 cm.
- (1883) "Forget-Me-Not". Oil on canvas, 83.8 cm x 63.5 cm.
- (1883) Sir Henry Irving. Oil on canvas, 110.5 cm x 80 cm. Garrick Club, London.
- (1883) Love Birds or Une Grande Dame.
- (1884) An Idyll of 1745 or An Idyll, 1745. Oil on canvas, 140 cm × 191 cm. Lady Lever Art Gallery, Port Sunlight, Merseyside.
- (1884) Little Miss Muffett. Oil on canvas, 121.9 cm x 88.9 cm.
- (1884) In Perfect Bliss. Oil on canvas, 121.9 cm x 86.4 cm.
- (1884) Portrait of Lady Peggy Primrose. Oil on canvas, 119.4 cm x 83.8 cm.
- (1884) Portrait of Lady Campbell. Oil on canvas, 127 cm x 86.4 cm.
- (1884) Message from the Deep. Oil on canvas, 147.3 cm x 96.5 cm.
- (1884) The Mistletoe-Gatherer. Oil on canvas, 134.6 cm x 96.5 cm.
- (1884–85) The Right Honourable W. E. Gladstone
- (1885) The Ruling Passion or The Ornithologist. Oil on canvas, 160.7 cm × 215.9 cm. Kelvingrove Art Gallery and Museum, Glasgow.
- (1886) Bubbles. Oil on canvas, 102.8 cm × 73.6 cm. Lady Lever Art Gallery, Port Sunlight, Merseyside.
- (1886) Portia. Oil on canvas, 125.1 cm x 83.8 cm. Metropolitan Museum of Art, New York City.
- (1886) Archibald Philip Primrose, 5th Earl of Rosebery. Oil on canvas.
- (1886) Isabella Elder, née Ure (1828–1905). Oil on canvas, 127.6 cm x 84.5 cm. Glasgow Museums Resource Centre (GMRC), Glasgow.
- (1886) Lilacs. Oil on canvas, 104.1 cm x 71.1 cm.
- (1886) Portrait of Thomas Oldham Barlow. Oil on canvas, 101.6 cm x 116.8 cm. Gallery Oldham
- (1886) Mercy: St Bartholomew's Day, 1572
- (1887) Christmas Eve. Oil on canvas, 157.5 cm x 134 cm. Private collection.
- (1887) Il Penseroso or Penseroso. Oil on canvas, 127 cm x 92 cm.
- (1887) Clarissa. Oil on canvas, 146 cm x 94 cm.
- (1887) Portrait of Mrs Charles Stuart Wortley. Oil on canvas, 109.2 cm x 83.8 cm.
- (1887) The Nest. Oil on canvas, 127 cm x 96.5 cm.
- (1887) Murthly Moss. Oil on canvas, 127 cm x 188 cm.
- (1887) Allegro. Oil on canvas, 127 cm x 88.9 cm.
- (1888) Portrait of Arthur Sullivan. Oil on canvas, 115.6 cm × 87 cm. National Portrait Gallery, London.
- (1888) The Grey Lady. Oil on canvas, 140 cm x 94.5 cm. Private collection.
- (1888) The Old Garden. Oil on canvas, 114.3 cm x 121.9 cm. Private collection: Andrew Lloyd Webber Collection.
- (1888) The Last Rose of Summer or Portrait of Mary Hunt Millais (1860–1944). Oil on canvas. Private collection: Geoffroy Richard Everett Millais Collection, on long-term loan to Perth Art Gallery, Perth.
- (1888) Portrait of Mrs Paul Hardy. Oil on canvas, 127 cm x 86.4 cm.
- (1888) Murthly Water. Oil on canvas, 101.6 cm x 160 cm.
- (1888) Portrait of Charles J. Wertheimer, Esq.. Oil on canvas, 124.5 cm x 81.3 cm.
- (1889) Robert Rankin. Oil on canvas, 132 cm x 80.8 cm. Leighton House Museum, London.
- (1889–90) Dew-drenched Furze. Oil on canvas, 173.2 cm x 123 cm. Tate Gallery, London.
- (1890) Lingering Autumn. Oil on canvas, 186 cm x 125 cm. Lady Lever Art Gallery, Port Sunlight, Merseyside.
- (1890) "The Moon Is Up, And Yet It Is Not Night". Oil on canvas, 101.6 cm x 165.1 cm.
- (1891) Glen Birnam. Oil on canvas, 145.2 cm × 101.1 cm. Manchester Art Gallery, Manchester.
- (1891) Portrait of Mrs Charles Wertheimer (actually of Wertheimer's mistress Sarah Hammond rather than of his wife, Frieda Flachfeld). Oil on canvas, 127 cm x 84 cm.
- (1891) Portrait of Dorothy Lawson. Oil on canvas, 132 cm x 84.2 cm.
- (1891) Mary Chamberlain, née Endicott (1864–1957) or Portrait of Mrs Chamberlain. Oil on canvas, 134.1 cm x 102.4 cm. Birmingham Museums Trust, Birmingham.
- (1891) Portrait of the Hon. Mrs Herbert Gibbs. Oil on canvas, 142.2 cm x 104.1 cm.
- (1891) Grace. Oil on canvas, 142.2 cm x 86.4 cm.
- (1891–92) "Little Speedwell's Darling Blue". Oil on canvas, 98 cm x 72 cm. Lady Lever Art Gallery, Port Sunlight, Merseyside.
- (1892) "Blow, Blow, Thou Winter Wind!". Oil on canvas, 155 cm x 108 cm. Auckland Art Gallery, Auckland.
- (1892) Portrait of Master Anthony de Rothschild. Oil on canvas, 130 cm x 76.2 cm.
- (1892) Halcyon Weather. Oil on canvas, 165.1 cm x 88.9 cm. Private collection: Geoffroy Richard Everett Millais Collection, on long-term loan to Perth Art Gallery, Perth.
- (1892) "Sweet Emma Moreland". Oil on canvas, 121.9 cm x 88.9 cm.
- (1893) The Girlhood of St. Theresa. Oil on canvas, 139.7 cm x 104.1 cm.
- (1893) Portrait of John Hare, Esq.. Oil on canvas, 124.5 cm x 86.4 cm.
- (1895) "Speak! Speak!". Oil on canvas, 210.8 cm x 167.6 cm. Tate Gallery, London.
- (1895) St Stephen. Oil on canvas, 152.4 cm x 114.3 cm. Tate Gallery, London.
- (1895) Time. Oil on canvas, 142.2 cm x 91.44 cm.
- (1896) A Forerunner. Oil on canvas, 141.2 cm x 82.2 cm. Glasgow Museums Resource Centre (GMRC), Glasgow.
- (1896) Portrait of Sir Robert Pullar. Oil on canvas, 124.5 cm x 78.7 cm.
- (1896) Portrait of Sir Richard Quain, Bart., M.D.. Oil on canvas, 127 cm x 76.2 cm.

== See also ==
- List of Pre-Raphaelite paintings
