= Joan of Arc (Millais) =

Painting by John Everett Millais

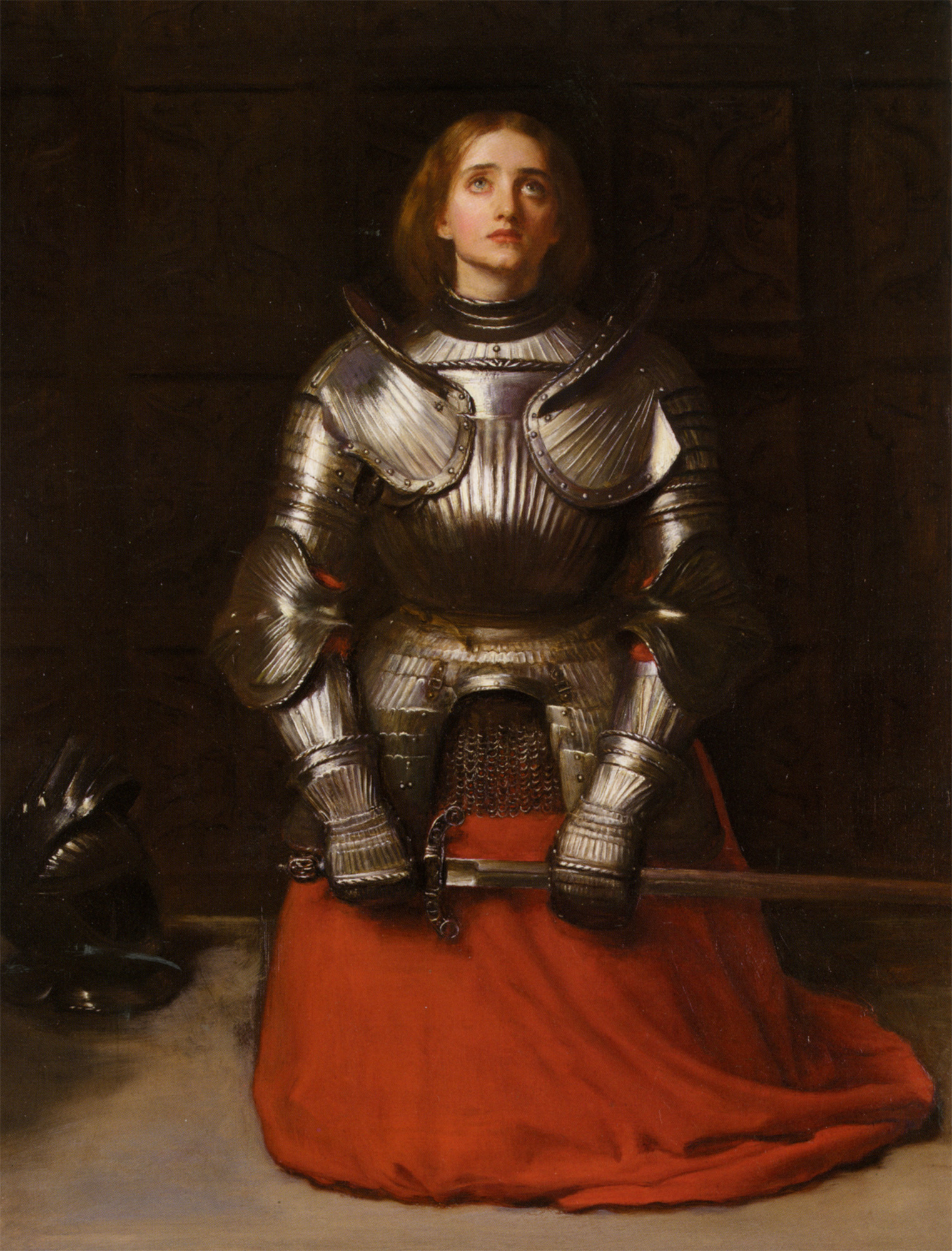
- Artist: John Everett Millais
- Year: 1865
- Type: Oil on canvas, history painting
- Dimensions: 82 cm × 62 cm (32 in × 24 in)
- Location: Private Collection

Joan of Arc is an 1865 oil painting by the British artist John Everett Millais. It depicts the French saint Joan of Arc dressed in armour and praying. Her visions inspired the breaking of the Siege of Orléans, turning the tide of the Hundred Years War.

Robert Southey’s epic poem Joan of Arc may have been an inspiration for Millais. The subject hadn't previously attracted British artists in comparison to their the French counterparts, but Victorian audiences were more responsive to its theme. The painting was displayed at the Royal Academy Exhibition of 1865 held at the National Gallery in London.

== See also ==
- List of paintings by John Everett Millais

== Bibliography ==
- Barlow, Paul. Time Present and Time Past: The Art of John Everett Millais. Taylor & Francis, 2017.
- Wagner, Corinna & Parker, Joanne. The Oxford Handbook of Victorian Medievalism. Oxford University Press, 2020.
- Weintraub, Stanley. The Unexpected Shaw: Biographical Approaches to G.B.S. and His Work. Bloomsbury Publishing, 1982.
