= Mrs Charles Freeman (Millais painting) =

Painting by John Everett Millais

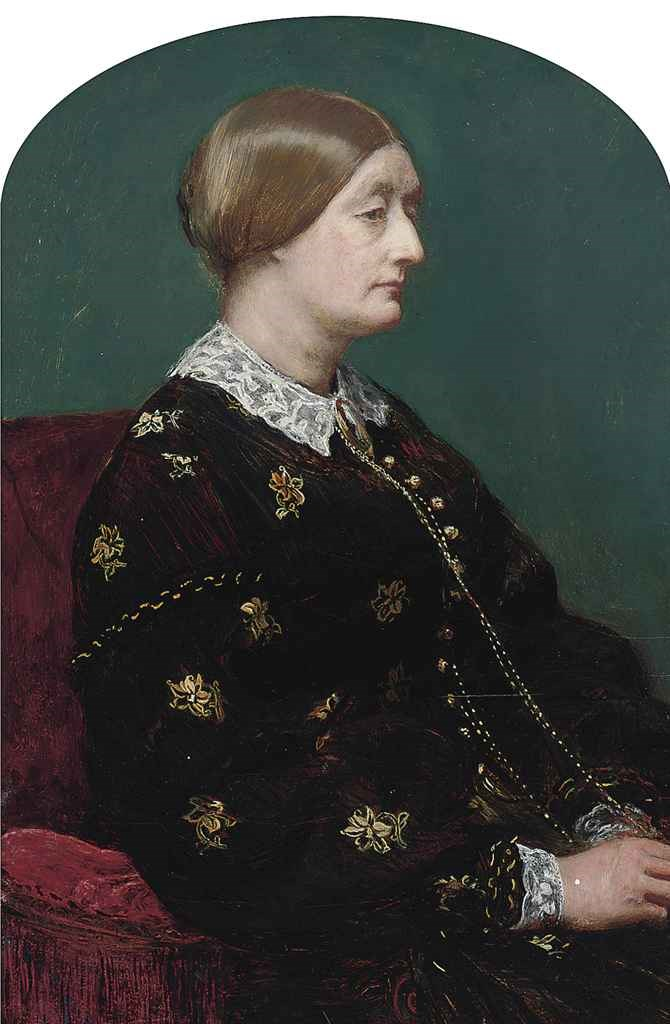
- Artist: John Everett Millais
- Year: 1862
- Type: oil on panel
- Dimensions: 35.5 cm × 22.5 cm (14.0 in × 8.9 in)
- Location: Private collection

Mrs Charles Freeman is an 1862 oil painting by the English artist John Everett Millais. It shows a seated older woman in near-profile. She wears a dark dress with a floral design, and lace collars and cuffs. It is signed with Millais' monogram and dedicated 'To Charles Freeman' and dated '1862', in the lower left corner.

== The painting ==
Charles Freeman was an architect and surveyor who helped Millais purchase and then redesign the interior of his new home at Cromwell Place in South Kensington, London in 1861. Millais undertook this portrait of Freeman's wife Caroline in 1862, and presented it to Freeman as a gift.

The painting hung in the Royal Academy Exhibition of 1862, catalogue number 356, along with Millais' The Ransom and Trust Me. A review of the exhibition in The Saturday Review of Politics, Literature, Science, and Art described the painting:

A small portrait of "Mrs Charles Freeman" (356), by J. E. Millais, possesses wonderful truth and individuality of character. Great power of colour, blended with a complete expression of character, constitutes the main charm of this little picture.

while The London Review and Weekly Journal of Politics, Literature, Art, & Society was a little less complimentary:

356. Millais. Mrs Charles Freeman. A small head-and-shoulders portrait, with an eminent look of truth, but not at all worthy of Mr. Millais in point of painting. It is hasty, streaky and wanting in richness of surface.

The painting was bequeathed by Caroline Freeman to her friend and executor Edward Matthey, c. 1880. It was sold on 20 July 1966 by an anonymous vendor at Sotheby's London auction, Lot 359, to D. S. Shaw, for £65. It was again sold on 22 November 1968 by an anonymous vendor at Christie's London auction, Lot 64, to the husband of the 2011 vendor for 95 guineas. It was sold on 16 March 2011 at Christie's "Victorian & British Impressionist Pictures Including Drawings & Watercolours" sale in London, Lot 70, for £10,000 to an anonymous buyer.

An earlier painting by Millais, Wandering Thoughts of c. 1854, was at some point in its history incorrectly identified as Mrs Charles Freeman. It was bought by Manchester City Art Gallery from the Manchester art dealer Charles A. Jackson in 1913 under this title.

== See also ==
- List of paintings by John Everett Millais
