= Effie with Foxgloves in Her Hair =

Painting by John Everett Millais

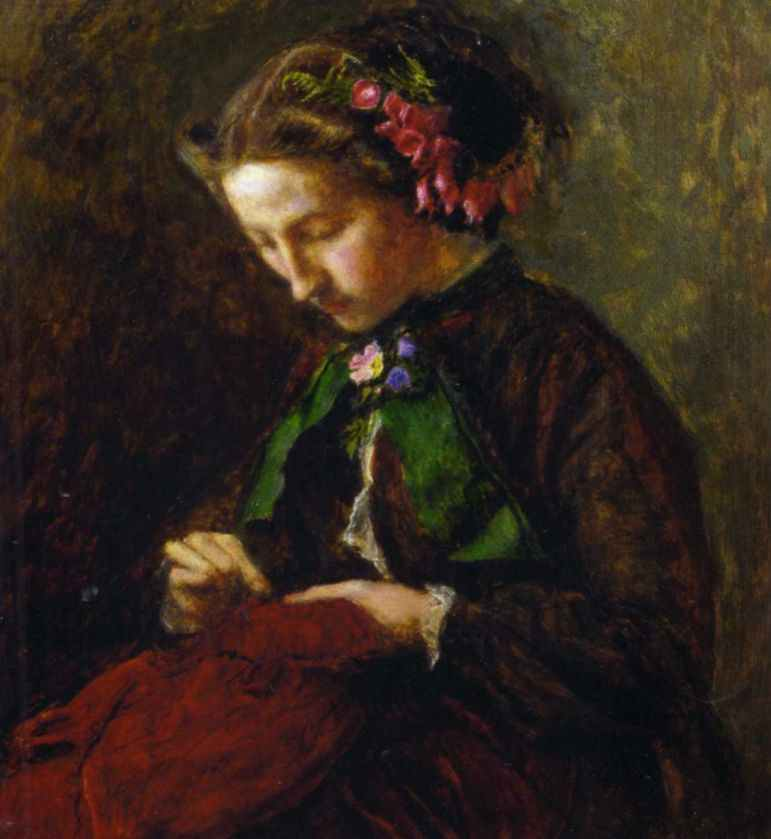
- Artist: John Everett Millais
- Year: 1853
- Type: Oil on millboard
- Dimensions: 37.3 cm × 35.1 cm (14.7 in × 13.8 in)
- Location: National Trust: Wightwick Manor, Wolverhampton

Effie with Foxgloves in her Hair or Euphemia 'Effie' Chalmers Gray, Mrs John Ruskin (1828–1898), later Lady Millais, with Foxgloves in her Hair or The Foxglove is an 1853 painting by the English artist John Everett Millais. It shows a seated woman sewing. She wears a black dress with green ribbons at the neck decorated with a dog rose and harebells, and her black lace cap bears a stem of foxglove flowers.

== The painting ==
Effie with Foxgloves in her Hair was made during Millais' holiday with John Ruskin and his wife Effie in the Scottish Highlands in the summer of 1853, during which time Millais and Effie fell in love. It was painted at about the same time as The Waterfall.

Ruskin wrote to his father on 14 July 1853:

Wet weather again—but Millais has painted a beautiful study of Effie with foxgloves in her hair.

The painting was presumably completed by 19 July, when Ruskin wrote that he had been given the sketch by Millais:

[Millais] has been making me innumerable presents of little sketches and a beautiful one of Effie with foxgloves in her hair—worth at least £50.

However, Millais never handed the painting over to Ruskin, and after the annulment of Effie and Ruskin's marriage in 1854, Millais wrote to Effie on 21 or 22 July 1854:

Bye the bye what am I to do with the little portrait I did of you with the foxgloves? I have never sent it to him, and now I suppose it is impossible and yet I do not like to keep it after giving it him.

The painting is now in the ownership of the National Trust, and is displayed at Wightwick Manor in Wolverhampton. It was either bought in 1949 by the National Trust for Wightwick Manor from Sir Ralph Regnault Millais, 5th Bt (1905–1992), a descendant of the artist (according to the National Trust information), or transferred to the charity on the death of Rosalie Glynn Grylls, Lady Mander, in 1988 (according to the Art UK information). Grylls' husband Geoffrey Mander had donated their house, Wightwick Manor, with its representative collection of Victorian and Pre-Raphaelite art and manuscripts, to the National Trust in 1937. She continued to open the house to the public and add to its contents until her death on 2 November 1988.

== See also ==
- List of paintings by John Everett Millais
