= Wandering Thoughts =

Painting by John Everett Millais

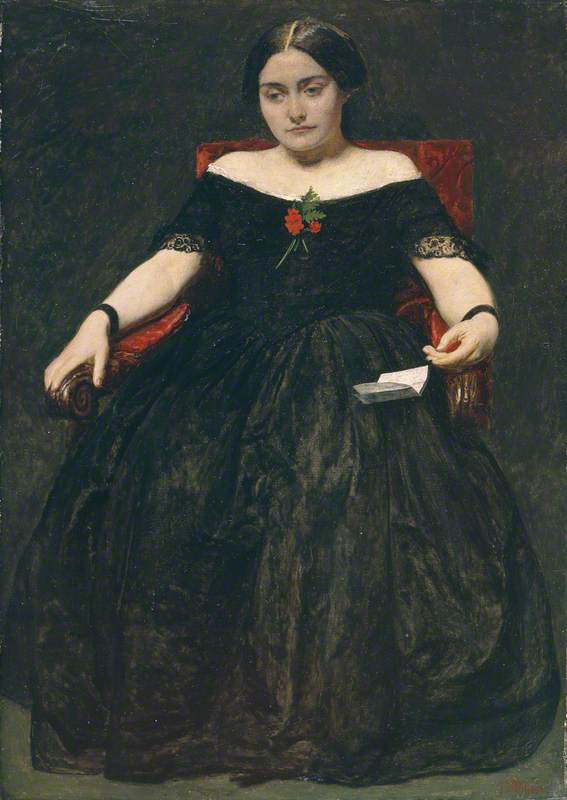
- Artist: John Everett Millais
- Year: c. 1854
- Type: Oil on canvas
- Dimensions: 35.2 cm × 24.9 cm (13.9 in × 9.8 in)
- Location: Manchester City Art Gallery, Manchester

Wandering Thoughts is an oil painting by the English artist John Everett Millais, painted in circa 1854. It is a full-length portrait of a woman in a black dress with a posy of red flowers and green leaves at her bosom, and a letter lying in her lap. She sits in a red chair.

== The painting ==
The woman's black dress and contemplative expression might suggest she is in mourning. Fellow Pre-Raphaelite artist Ford Madox Brown described the painting as "a noble study of Millais, [of] an ugly girl in black receiving bad news".

The painting was owned in 1854 by early Pre-Raphaelite patron Francis McCracken. It was purchased by Manchester City Art Gallery in 1913 from Mr Charles A. Jackson.

At some point in its history, Wandering Thoughts was incorrectly known as Mrs Charles Freeman. It was bought from the Manchester art dealer Charles Jackson under this title. However, Mrs Charles Freeman is an entirely different painting by Millais, from 1862.

== See also ==
- List of paintings by John Everett Millais
