= Serjeant Ralph Thomas =

Painting by John Everett Millais

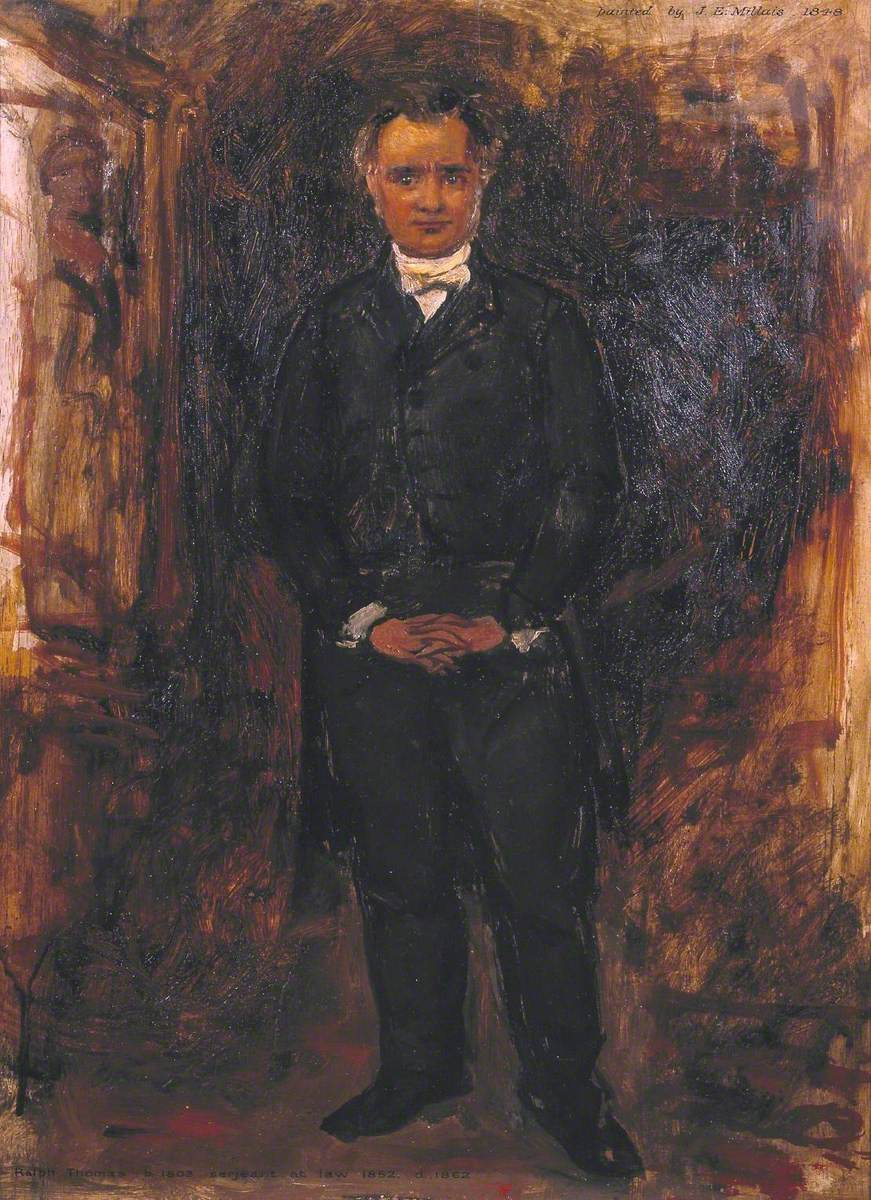
- Artist: John Everett Millais
- Year: 1848
- Type: Oil on wood
- Dimensions: 40.7 cm × 30.3 cm (16.0 in × 11.9 in)
- Location: Tate Gallery, London

Serjeant Ralph Thomas is an early oil painting by English artist John Everett Millais, painted in 1848 when Millais was 18 or 19.

== The painting ==
The painting, oil on canvas, shows a man standing with his hands linked at his front, with a painting on an easel to the left of the image. The background is filled with dark, roughly applied brushstrokes.

== The sitter ==
Ralph Thomas (died 1862) was a lawyer, with the title of serjeant-at-law, hence the painting's use of the title Serjeant. He was possibly an acquaintance of Millais' parents, and was a picture collector, dealer, occasional print publisher, and contributor to Notes and Queries. In around 1845, some three years before this portrait was painted, Thomas retained Millais on £100 a year to paint small pictures for him, and Millais' first-ever payment for a painting was a cheque from Thomas for £5 for a small sketch. The arrangement continued for two years, before Millais withdrew, feeling that his patron was taking advantage of him. The date of this portrait suggests that some kind of connection between the two continued after this.

Thomas was possibly the model for Dickens' Serjeant Buzfuz in The Pickwick Papers. He had four sons, including Ralph Jr. (born 1840), Edmund (born 1842) and Percy. In 1901, after both Thomas' and Millais' deaths, Ralph Thomas Jr. published Serjeant Thomas and Sir J. E. Millais, Bart., P.R.A. in a limited edition of 200 volumes. In the book, Thomas refuted claims in the book The Life and Letters of Sir J. E. Millais, Bart. by Millais' son, John Guille Millais, that Ralph Thomas Sr. had exploited Millais.

The painting was presented to the Tate in 1917 by Ralph Thomas Jr.

== See also ==
- List of paintings by John Everett Millais
