= Memory (Millais painting) =

Painting by John Everett Millais

- Artist: John Everett Millais
- Year: 1852
- Type: Oil on panel
- Dimensions: 30.5 cm × 25.4 cm (12.0 in × 10.0 in)

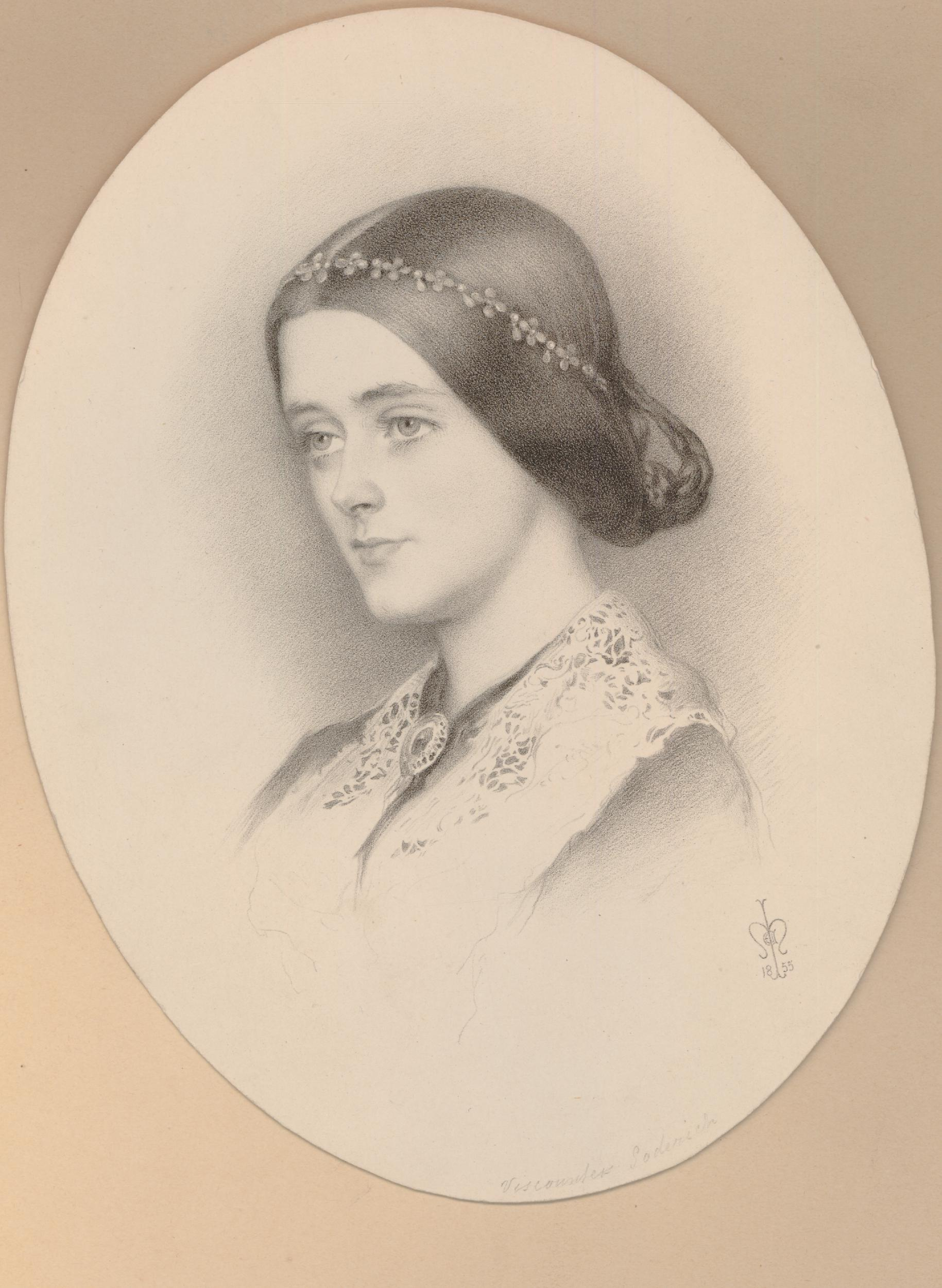
Print of Henrietta Anne Theodosia (née Vyner), Marchioness of Ripon by Richard James Lane from a painting by John Everett Millais, 1855. British Museum.

Memory is a portrait painting by the English artist John Everett Millais of a lady in a white dress, with a wreath of passion flowers round her head. The small bust (head and shoulders) was painted in 1852.

The painting was exhibited in a special Winter Exhibition at the Royal Academy, London, held between January and March 1898, which featured many collected works of the late Millais. At the time it was the property of the Marquess of Ripon, K.G.. It was the first picture in the exhibition, catalogue no. 1.

In volume 1 of the 1899 publication, The Life and Letters of John Everett Millais by Maillais' son John Guille Millais, it is mentioned that '"Memory", a little head of the Marchioness of Ripon, was also painted this winter [early 1852].' At the time of the painting the sitter, Henrietta Anne Theodosia (née Vyner), although titled, was not yet Marchioness of Ripon—her husband was made Marquess of Ripon in 1871.

The current location of the painting is not known.

A print made by Richard James Lane after a painting by John Everett Millais, with the JEM monograph of the artist and dated by him 1855, shows a bust of Henrietta Anne Theodosia (née Vyner), Marchioness of Ripon. She has a floral jewellery circlet in her hair, but no passion flowers, and her dress is not white. An example of this print is held in the National Portrait Gallery, London. Another print, lacking the text along the base of the oval, is in the collection of the British Museum, London.

== See also ==
- List of paintings by John Everett Millais
