= Blow, Blow, Thou Winter Wind =

Painting by John Everett Millais

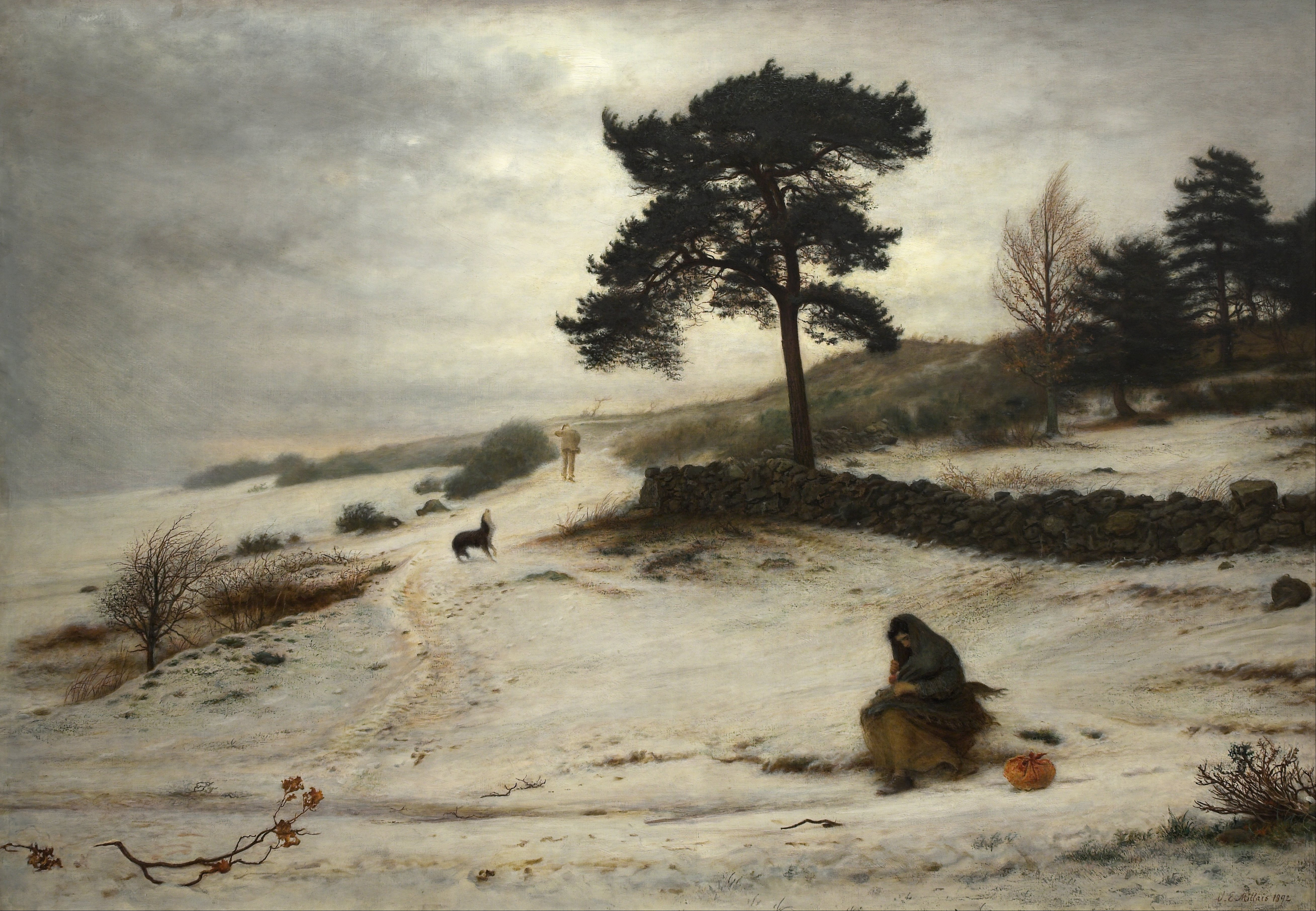
- Artist: John Everett Millais
- Year: 1892
- Type: Oil on canvas, landscape painting
- Dimensions: 108 cm × 155 cm (43 in × 61 in)
- Location: Auckland Art Gallery, Auckland

Blow, Blow, Thou Winter Wind is an 1892 oil painting by the British artist John Everett Millais. A landscape blended with genre painting it shows a snow-covered scene in which a woman sits with her child, apparently abandoned by her lover. The title is drawn from a passage in William Shakespeare's As You Like It.

The work was displayed at the Royal Academy's Summer Exhibition of 1892. The painting is now in the collection of the Auckland Art Gallery in New Zealand.

== See also ==
- List of paintings by John Everett Millais

== Bibliography ==
- Barlow, Paul. Time Present and Time Past: The Art of John Everett Millais. Routledge, 2017.
- Marshall, Gail (ed.) Shakespeare in the Nineteenth Century. Cambridge University Press, 2012.
- Sillars, Stuart. Shakespeare and the Victorians. Oxford University Press, 2013.
