= A Widow's Mite =

Painting by John Everett Millais

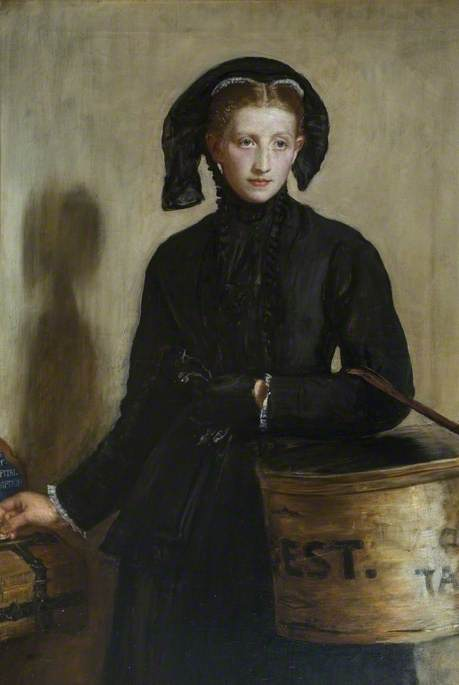
- Artist: John Everett Millais
- Year: 1870
- Type: Oil on canvas, history painting
- Dimensions: 131.5 cm × 92.4 cm (51.8 in × 36.4 in)
- Location: Birmingham Art Gallery, Birmingham

A Widow's Mite is an 1870 oil painting by the British artist John Everett Millais. The picture combines portraiture and genre painting ane shows a young Victorian widow dressed in mourning black dropping some coins into a charitable collection box. The title references the biblical quotation from the Gospel of Mark. Millais has previously submitted a design for the same subject unsuccessfully during the decorating of the rebuilt Houses of Parliament in 1847.

Millais had been a founding member of the Pre-Raphaelite Brotherhood but gradually moved to adopt a more conventional output. He returned to his earlier subject with this work. The painting was displayed at the Royal Academy Exhibition of 1870 held at Burlington House in London. Today the picture is part of the collection of the Birmingham Art Gallery, which purchased it in 1891.

== See also ==
- List of paintings by John Everett Millais

== Bibliography ==
- Barlow, Paul. Time Present and Time Past: The Art of John Everett Millais. Routledge, 2017.
- Boime, Albert. Art in an Age of Civil Struggle, 1848-1871. University of Chicago Press, 2008.
- Fleming, Gordon H. John Everett Millais: A Biography. Constable, 1998.
