= Portrait of William Ewart Gladstone =

Painting by John Everett Millais

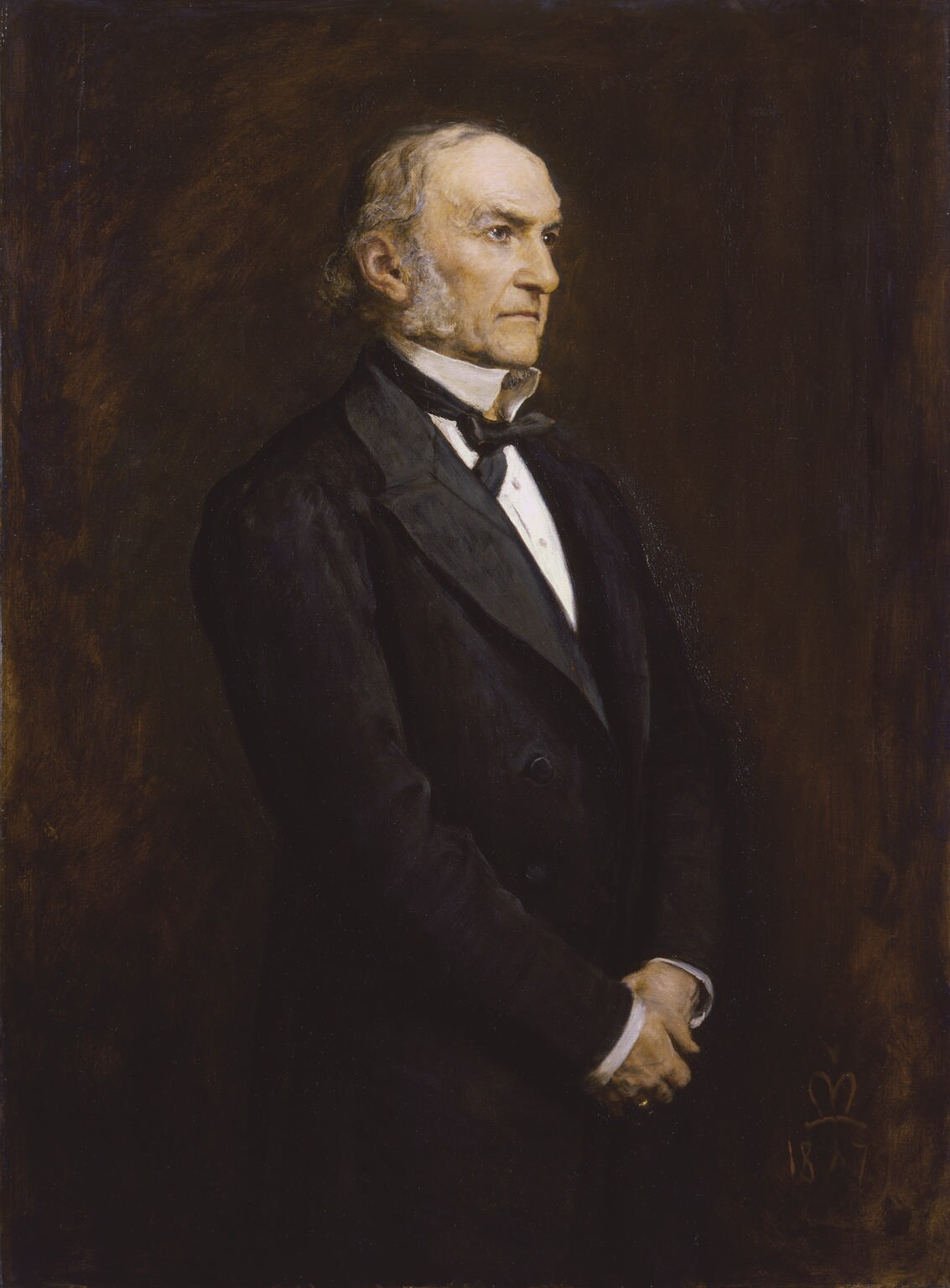
- Artist: John Everett Millais
- Year: 1879
- Type: Oil on canvas, portrait painting
- Dimensions: 125.7 cm × 91.4 cm (49.5 in × 36.0 in)
- Location: National Portrait Gallery, London

Portrait of William Ewart Gladstone is an 1879 portrait painting by the British artist John Everett Millais. It depicts the politician William Ewart Gladstone who served as Prime Minister four times. It was one of a series of portraits of leading figures Millais produced during the era, including his Portrait of Benjamin Disraeli featuring Gladstone's political rival. The work was initiated by Millais himself, rather than being commissioned and was then bought for a thousand pounds by the art dealer William Agnew who sold it ten days later to the Duke of Westminster.

The painting was displayed at the Royal Academy Exhibition of 1879 at Burlington House in London. Louisa Knightley described It as "undoubtedly the picture of the year" while Gladstone himself considered it a "a very fine work". A mezzotint was produced by the engraver Thomas Oldham Barlow, who submitted a version as his diploma work when elected to the Royal Academy of Arts in 1881. The original painting has been in the collection of the National Portrait Gallery since 1957, having previously been in the Tate Gallery.

== See also ==
- List of paintings by John Everett Millais

== Bibliography ==
- Barlow, Paul. Time Present and Time Past: The Art of John Everett Millais. Routledge, 2017.
- Mancoff, Debra N. (ed.) John Everett Millais: Beyond the Pre-Raphaelite Brotherhood. Yale University Press, 2021.
- Quinault, Roland. William Gladstone: New Studies and Perspectives. Taylor & Francis, 2016.
- Riding, Christine. Tate British Artists: John Everett Millais. Harry N. Abrams, 2006.
