= The Boyhood of Raleigh =

1870 painting by John Everet Millais

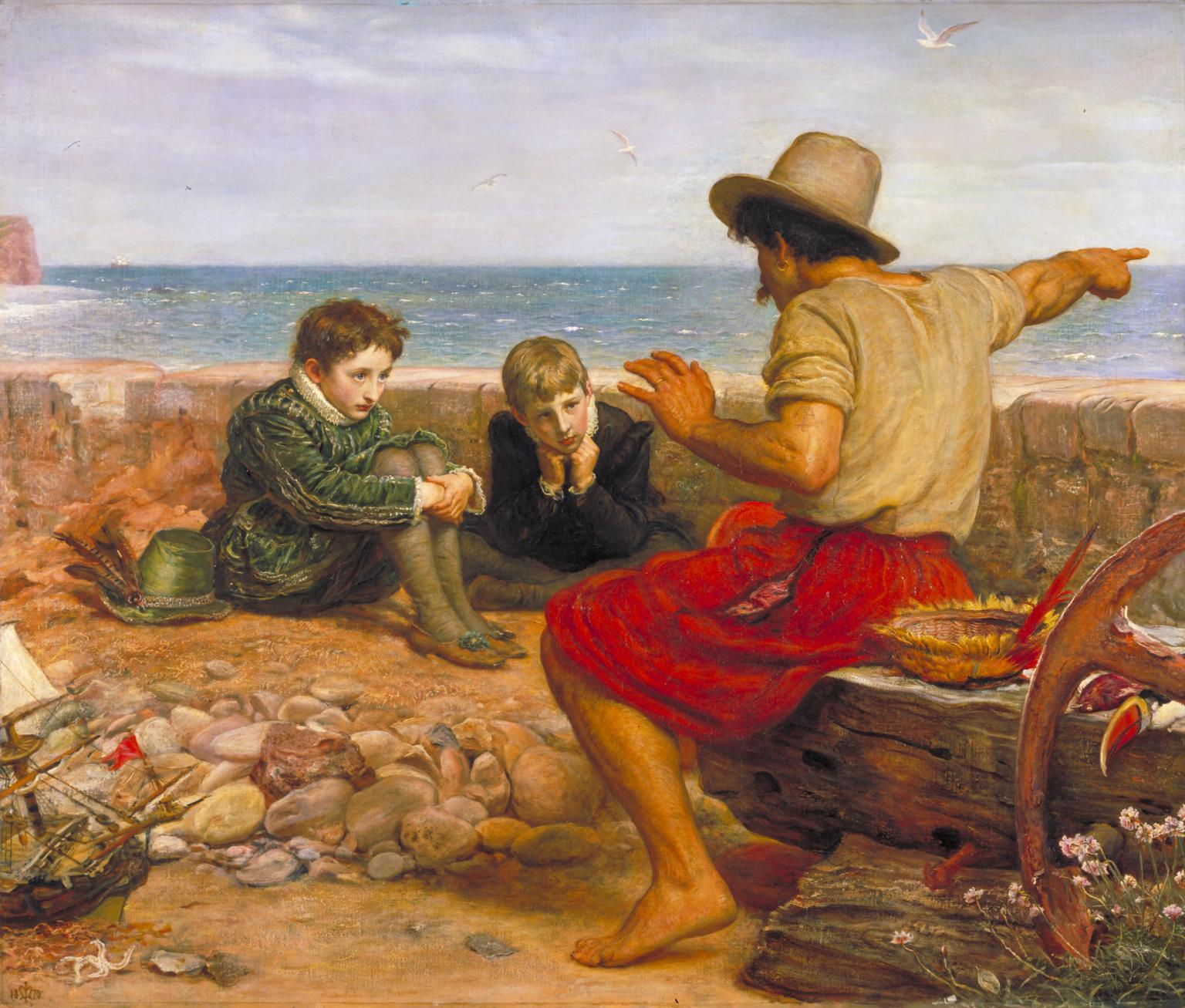
- Artist: John Everett Millais
- Year: 1870
- Medium: Oil on canvas
- Dimensions: 120.6 cm × 142.2 cm (47.5 in × 56.0 in)
- Location: Tate Gallery, London

The Boyhood of Raleigh is an 1870 painting by John Everett Millais in the collection of the Tate Gallery. In the painting, Millais depicts famed Elizabethan-era explorer Walter Raleigh and his brother on the Devonshire coast listening to a Genoese sailor pointing out to sea and telling the pair of "tales of wonder on sea and land".

Inspired by an essay written by historian James Anthony Froude, the painting was exhibited at the Royal Academy in 1871. Quickly receiving acclaim, it went on to be the subject of parody by numerous 20th century political cartoons and album covers.

== Origins ==
The painting was inspired by an essay written by James Anthony Froude on England's Forgotten Worthies, which described the lives of Elizabethan seafarers. It was also probably influenced by a contemporaneous biography of Raleigh, which imagined his experiences listening to old sailors as a boy. Millais travelled to Budleigh Salterton to paint the location.

Millais's sons Everett and George modelled for the boys. The sailor was a professional model. Millais' friend and biographer, the critic Marion Spielmann, stated that he was intended to be Genoese. He also argues that the sailor is pointing south towards the "Spanish main".

== Literary and satirical use ==
=== Cartoons ===
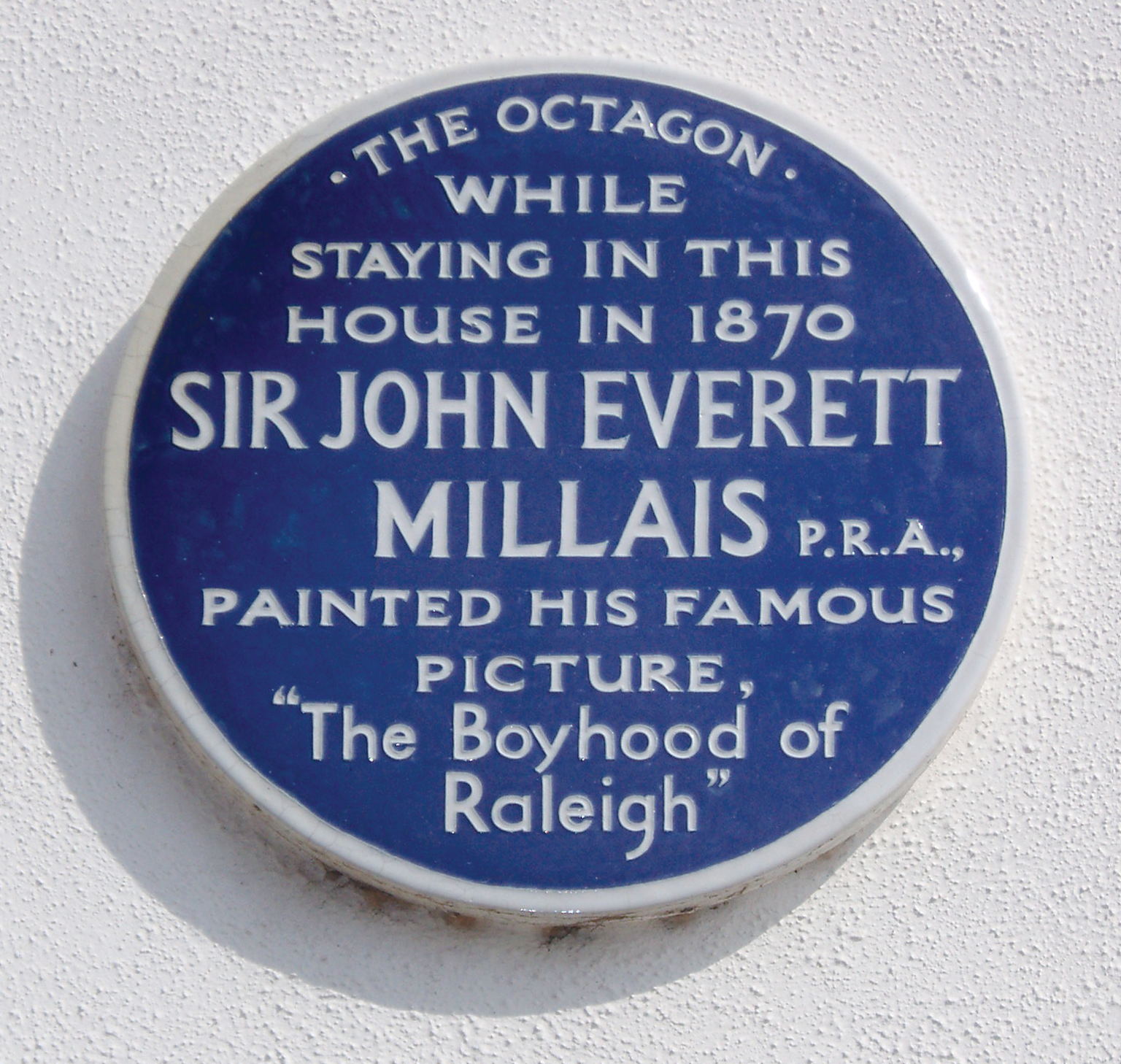
Blue plaque in Budleigh Salterton commemorating Millais's creation of the painting

The painting has been parodied many times in political cartoons.

In 1928, New Zealand cartoonist David Low published a political cartoon showing the Earl of Birkenhead (the incumbent Secretary of State for India), Stanley Baldwin (the incumbent Prime Minister) and Winston Churchill (the incumbent Chancellor of the Exchequer) listening to "Tales of the Dominions" from Leo Amery (the incumbent Colonial Secretary).

In 1993, the Sunday Telegraph ran "The Boyhood of Hurd and Major". The then Prime Minister John Major and Foreign Secretary Douglas Hurd, who had recently pushed the Maastricht Treaty through Parliament against the wishes of many Conservatives, were shown as small boys in Elizabethan costume, listening as an old sailor (Sir Edward Heath) gestured towards the coast labelled "Europe" visible on the other side of the water. Former Prime Minister Heath—whose hobby had been yachting—had taken Britain into the EEC (as it was then called) during his premiership, and had grown up in Kent where the coast of France is visible on a clear day. At the time Heath was Father of the House of Commons and enjoying something of an Indian Summer after the ousting of his political nemesis, the eurosceptic Margaret Thatcher, as prime minister in 1990.

In 1999, the Daily Telegraph published a Garland cartoon, showing the then Conservative leader William Hague as a small boy (this was common in satire at the time, as Hague had first attained national fame as a teenager in the 1970s), while two old sailors—former Foreign Secretary David Owen and former Chancellor of the Exchequer Denis Healey—gestured inland and away from a ship labelled "Euro". The two elder statesmen described themselves as pro-European but opposed to British membership of the Single Currency.

=== Postcolonialism ===
The picture has also appeared in recent explorations of postcolonialism, most notably Salman Rushdie's 1981 novel Midnight's Children, in which the narrator Saleem Sinai partly misremembers and transforms the meaning of the painting, a copy of which hung on his bedroom wall when he was a child.

=== Popular culture ===
Elements of the picture appear on the cover of the English band Talk Talk's 1984 album It's My Life.

The painting is also reproduced in part on the cover of the 1982 single "Almost With You/Life Speeds Up" by The Church.

The painting is referenced in the Lord Peter Wimsey 2002 novel A Presumption of Death, by Jill Paton Walsh and Dorothy L. Sayers, and in Susan Hill's 1983 ghost story The Woman in Black.

== See also ==
- List of paintings by John Everett Millais
