= Princess Elizabeth in Prison at St James's =

Painting by John Everett Millais

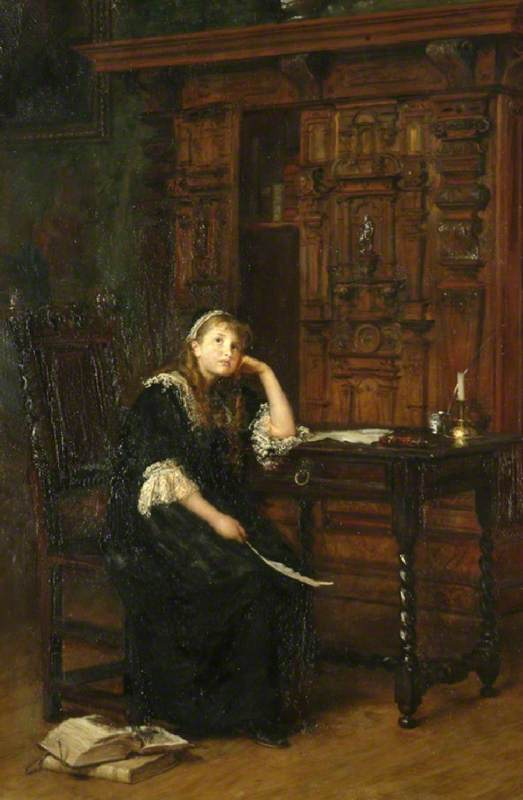
- Artist: John Everett Millais
- Year: 1879
- Type: Oil on canvas, history painting
- Dimensions: 144.7 cm × 101.5 cm (57.0 in × 40.0 in)
- Location: Royal Holloway College; Surrey

Princess Elizabeth in Prison at St James's is an 1879 history painting by the British artist John Everett Millais. It depicts Elizabeth Stuart, the daughter of Charles I, who was detained at St James's Palace by Parliamentary forces on the outbreak of the English Civil War in 1642. Along with her brother Henry she remained in their custody throughout the fighting. She died at Carisbrooke Castle in 1650, at the age of fourteen, a year after her father had been executed.

Both it and a pendant painting The Princes in the Tower show imprisoned royal children who will not live to adulthood. The concept of children becoming victims of political turmoil was a popular theme in Victorian art. Both paintings were acquired by Thomas Holloway and are now in the collection of Royal Holloway College in Surrey.

== See also ==
- List of paintings by John Everett Millais

== Bibliography ==
- Barlow, Paul. Time Present and Time Past: The Art of John Everett Millais. Routledge, 2017.
- Holloway, Verity. The Mighty Healer: Thomas Holloway's Victorian Patent Medicine Empire. Pen and Sword, 2016.
- Strong, Roy C. Painting the Past: The Victorian Painter and British History. Pimlico, 2004.
