= A Souvenir of Velasquez =

Painting by John Everett Millais

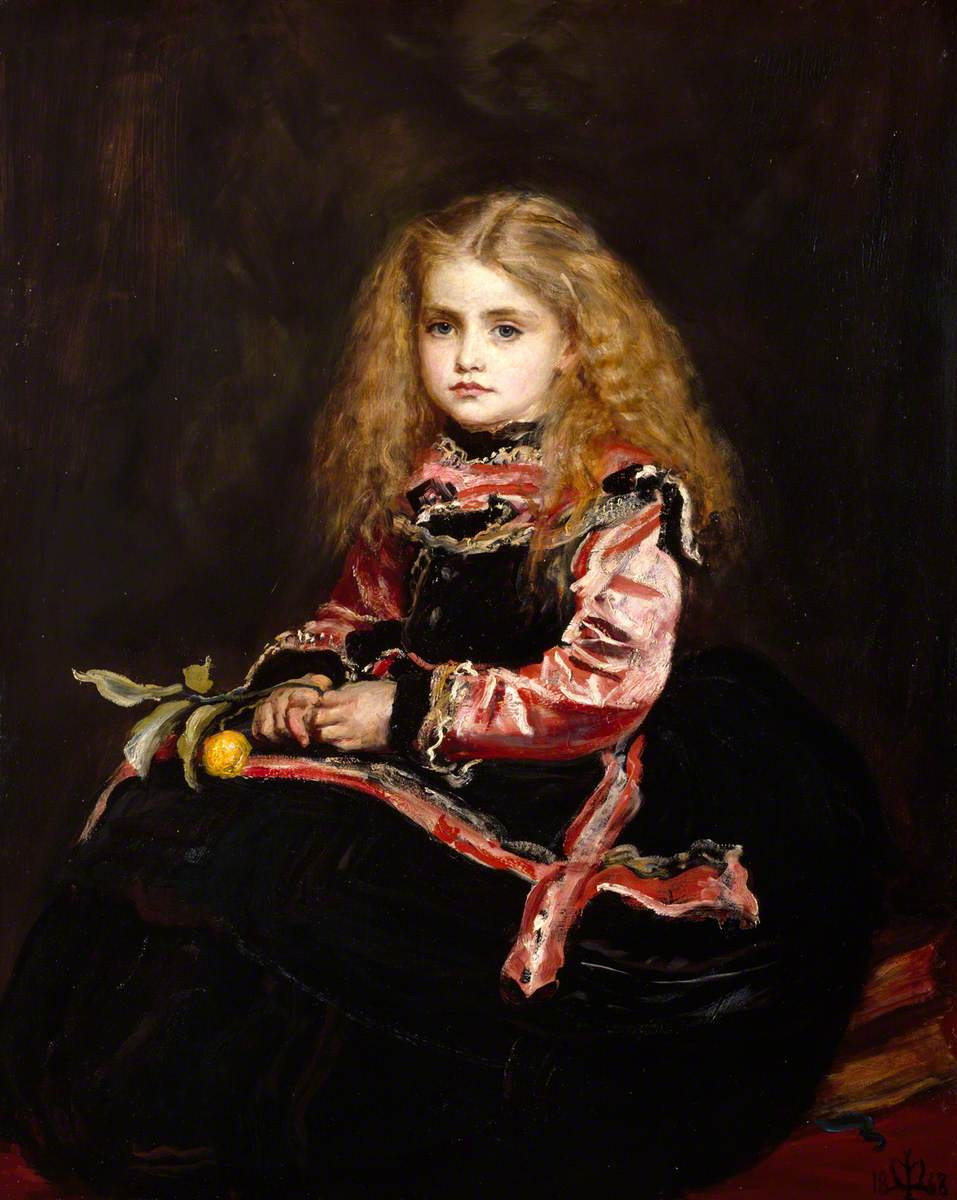
- Artist: John Everett Millais
- Year: 1868
- Type: Oil on canvas, portrait painting
- Dimensions: 102.7 cm × 82.4 cm (40.4 in × 32.4 in)
- Location: Royal Academy of Arts, London

A Souvenir of Velasquez is an 1868 oil painting by the British artist John Everett Millais. Featuring a portrait painting of a girl, it pays homage to the works of the Spanish Old Master Diego Velázquez particularly his portrait of the Infanta Margaret Theresa of Spain. Having made his name as a member of the Pre-Raphaelite Brotherhood, Millais moved increasingly towards mainstream academic art. This painting's expressive style reflects the development of Aestheticism and contrasts with the Realism of his earliest works. Millais presented the painting to the Royal Academy of Arts as his diploma work following his election to full membership It was displayed at the Royal Academy Exhibition of 1868 held at the National Gallery.

== See also ==
- List of paintings by John Everett Millais

== Bibliography ==
- Barlow, Paul. Time Present and Time Past: The Art of John Everett Millais. Routledge, 2017.
- Fish, Arthur. John Everett Millais, 1829-1896. Funk & Wagnalls, 1923.
- Riding, Christine. John Everett Millais. Harry N. Abrams, 2006.
- Tinterow, Gary. Manet/Velázquez: The French Taste for Spanish Painting. Metropolitan Museum of Art, 2003.
