= Portrait of the Marquess of Salisbury =

Painting by John Everett Millais

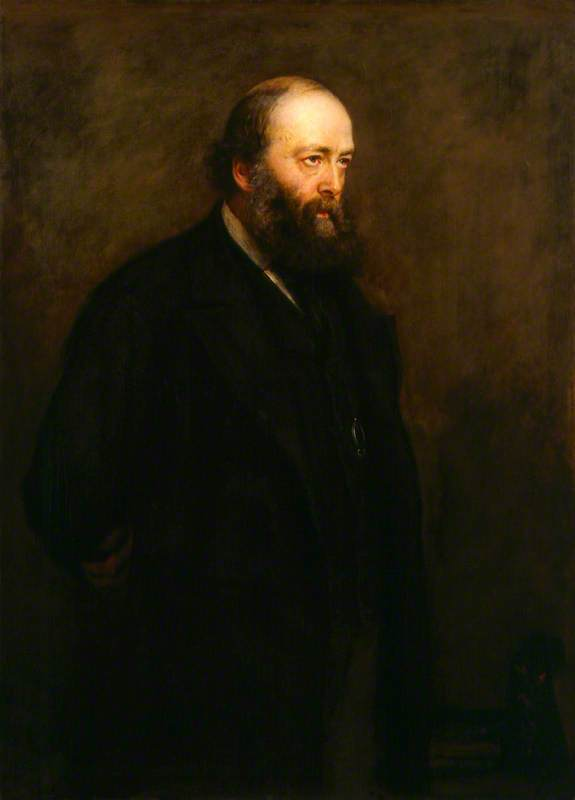
- Artist: John Everett Millais
- Year: 1883
- Type: Oil on canvas, portrait painting
- Dimensions: 127.3 cm × 93.3 cm (50.1 in × 36.7 in)
- Location: National Portrait Gallery; London

Portrait of the Marquess of Salisbury is an 1883 portrait painting by the British artist John Everett Millais. It depicts the politician Robert Gascoyne-Cecil, 3rd Marquess of Salisbury who served as Prime Minister three times and Foreign Secretary on four occasions. At the time he sat for the picture he was the Conservative Leader of the Opposition to his rival William Gladstone.

The painting is now in the possession of the National Portrait Gallery, having been donated by Lord Hambleden in 1945. A mezzotint was produced the same year, based on the picture, by Thomas Oldham Barlow. A copy of this is also in the collection of the National Portrait Gallery.

== See also ==
- List of paintings by John Everett Millais

== Bibliography ==
- Fleming, Gordon H. John Everett Millais: A Biography. Constable, 1998.
- Kennedy, Aubrey Leo. Salisbury, 1830-1903: Portrait of a Statesman. John Murray, 1953.
- Woodall, Joanna. Portraiture: Facing the Subject. Manchester University Press, 1997.
