= News from Home (Millais painting) =

Painting by John Everett Millais

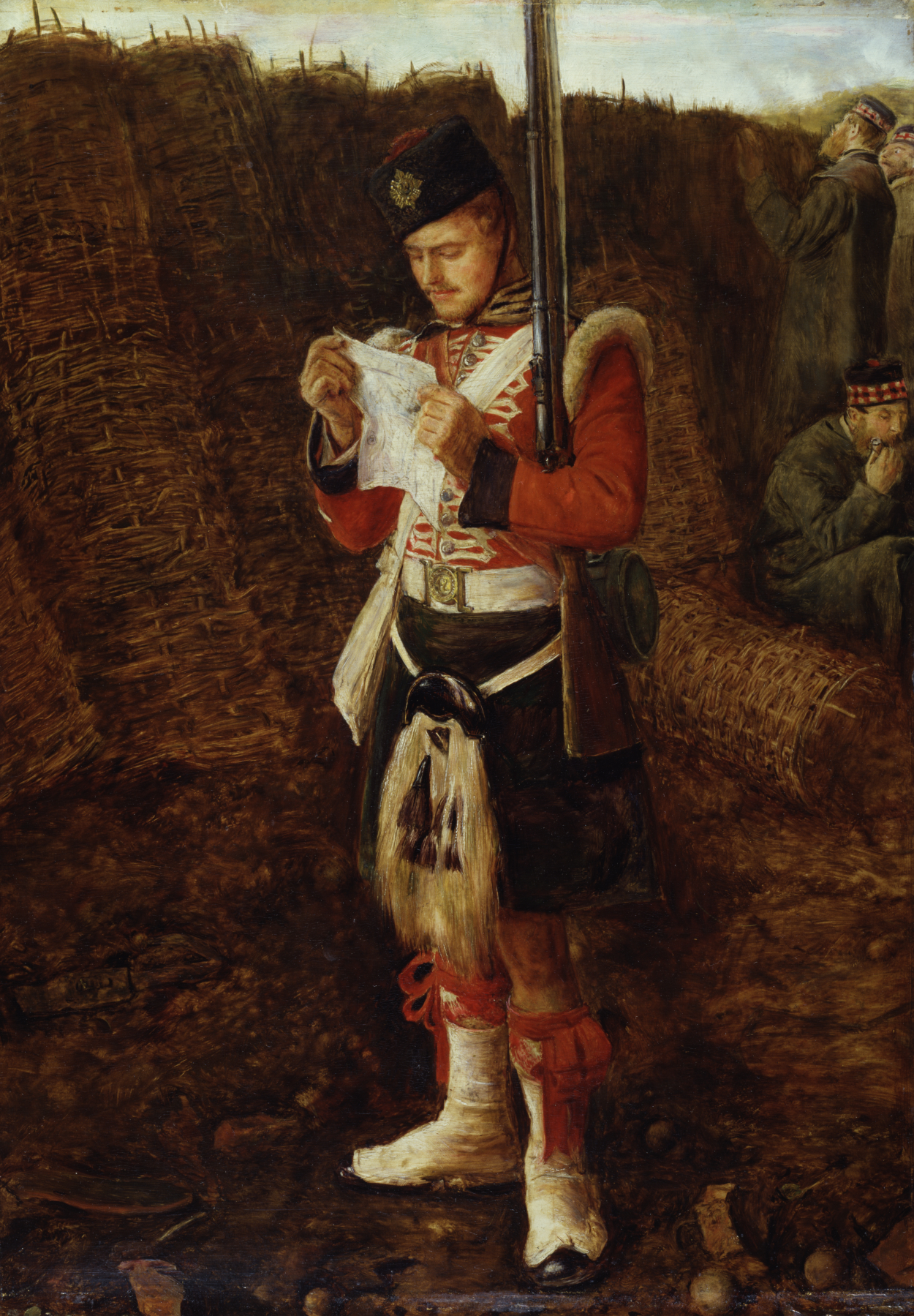
- Artist: John Everett Millais
- Year: 1856
- Type: Oil on panel
- Dimensions: 35.5 cm × 25 cm (14.0 in × 9.8 in)
- Location: Walters Art Museum, Baltimore, Maryland

News from Home is an 1856 oil painting by the English artist John Everett Millais, depicting a soldier of the 42nd Royal Highland Regiment, the famed Black Watch, reading a letter from home during the Crimean War. He wears a kilt and sporran, and arms a gun.

== The painting ==
Millais developed an interest in Scottish subjects from 1853 onwards, when he first went to the Scottish Highlands with the artist and critic John Ruskin and Ruskin's Scottish wife Effie Gray, with whom he fell in love. Ruskin and Gray's marriage was annulled in 1854, and Millais and Gray married the next year. For some years afterwards the couple lived for much of each year in Scotland.

Effie Gray recalled that Millais painted News from Home in the spring of 1856. The Crimean War (October 1853 to February 1856) had just ended, and Millais was one of several artists to use the imagery of soldiers in the Crimean War and their family members reading letters from each other.

Millais sold the painting to Mr Arthur J. Lewis of London. The painting was exhibited at the Royal Academy Exhibition of 1857 (catalogue number 50). John Ruskin ridiculed the soldier's immaculate turn-out given the conditions of trench warfare.

Subsequent owners were Charles W. Deschamps; then William T. Walters of Baltimore, who bought it in 1880; then Henry Walters of Baltimore, who inherited it in 1894. It was bequeathed to the Walters Art Museum in 1931 by Henry Walters.

== See also ==
- List of paintings by John Everett Millais
