= Portrait of Arthur Sullivan =

Painting by John Everett Millais

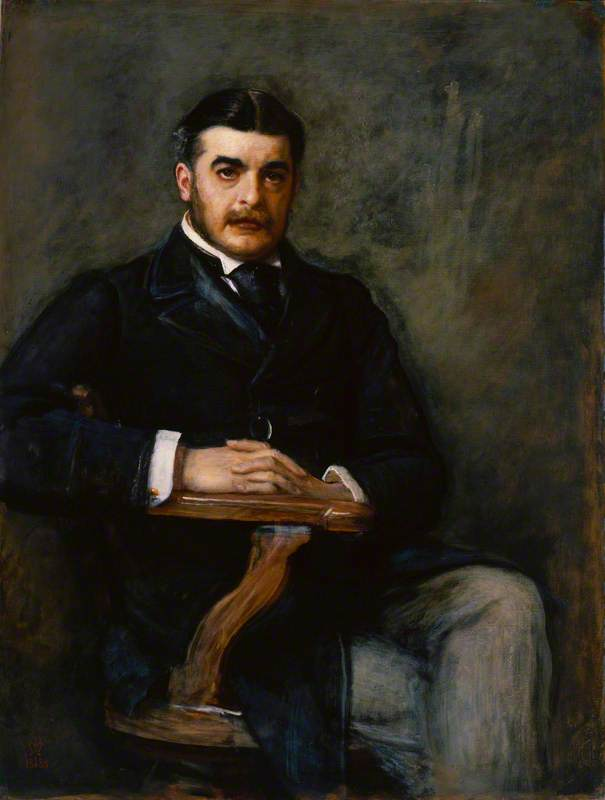
- Artist: John Everett Millais
- Year: 1888
- Type: Oil on canvas, portrait painting
- Dimensions: 115.6 cm × 87 cm (45.5 in × 34 in)
- Location: National Portrait Gallery; London

Portrait of Arthur Sullivan is an 1888 portrait painting by the British artist John Everett Millais. It depicts the English composer Arthur Sullivan, best known for his long-standing collaboration with the dramatist W. S. Gilbert.

Millais had made his mark as a member of the Pre-Raphaelite Brotherhood, but his work altered to reflect a more mainstream academic style. Towards the latter stages of his career he produced a number of fashionable high society portraits. In this picture Millais depicts Sullivan as an elegant figure of the late Victorian era.

Sullivan bequeathed the painting to the National Portrait Gallery in London, where it remains on display.

== See also ==
- List of paintings by John Everett Millais

== Bibliography ==
- Dillard, Phillip H. Sir Arthur Sullivan: A Resource Book. Bloomsbury Academic, 1996.
- Jacobs, Arthur. Arthur Sullivan: A Victorian Musician. Taylor & Francis, 2018.
- Ribeiro, Aileen. The Gallery of Fashion. National Portrait Gallery, 2000.
