= The Yeoman of the Guard (painting) =

Painting by John Everett Millais

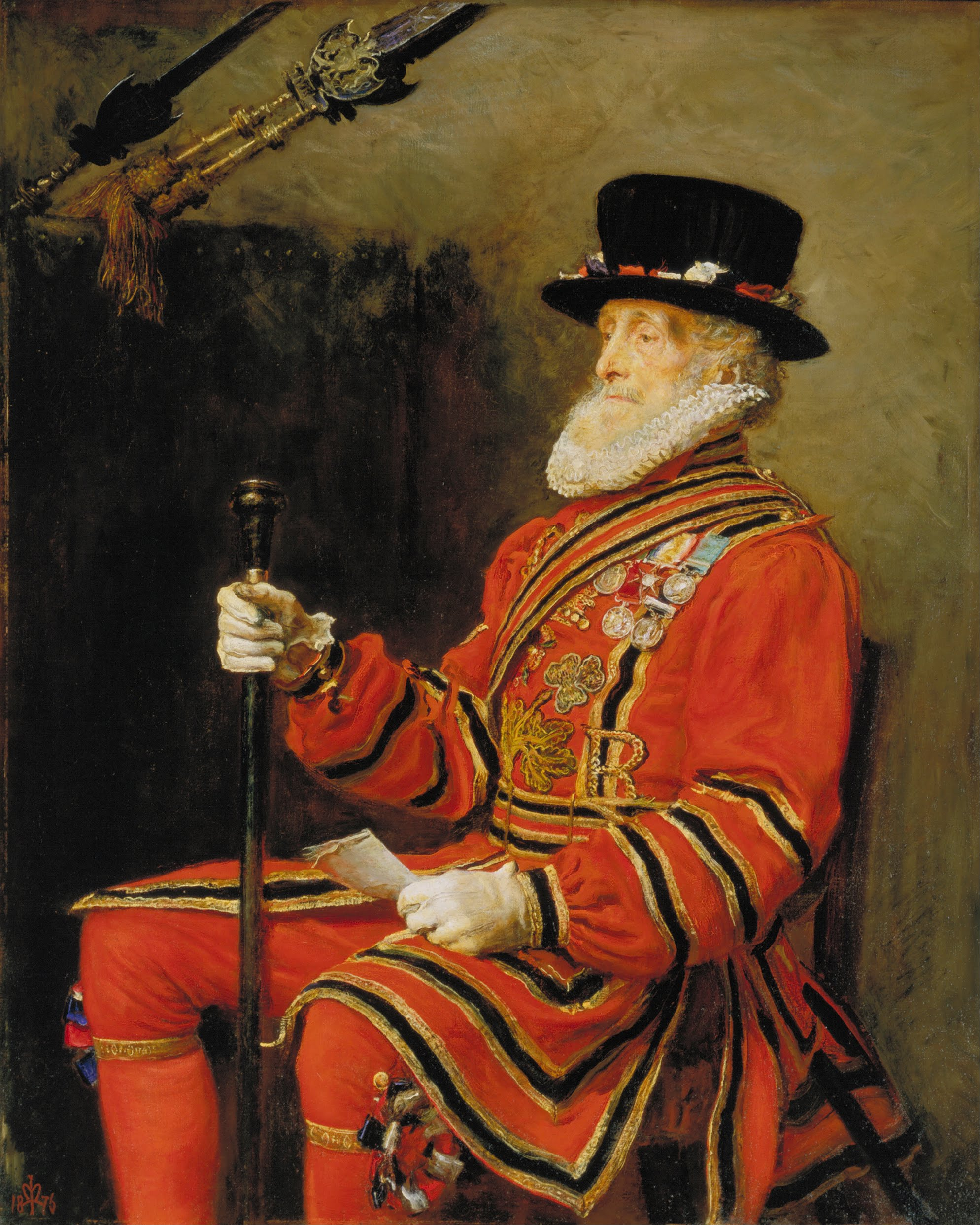
- Artist: John Everett Millais
- Year: 1876
- Type: Oil on canvas, portrait painting
- Dimensions: 139.7 cm × 111.8 cm (55.0 in × 44.0 in)
- Location: Tate Britain, London

The Yeoman of the Guard is an 1876 portrait painting by the British artist John Everett Millais. It depicts John Charles Montague who after the long service in the British Army's 16th Lancers joined the Yeoman Warder, popularly known as Beefeaters.

Millais made his name as a member of the Pre-Raphaelite Brotherhood but later focused his efforts on Academic art. This was one of his popular productions of his later period. It was displayed at the Royal Academy's Summer Exhibition of 1877 at Burlington House. The painting is now in the Tate Britain in Pimlico, having been acquired in 1897.

== See also ==
- List of paintings by John Everett Millais

== Bibliography ==
- Barlow, Paul. Time Present and Time Past: The Art of John Everett Millais. Routledge, 2017.
- Fish, Arthur. John Everett Millais, 1829-1896. Funk & Wagnalls, 1923.
