= The Princes in the Tower (painting) =

Painting by John Everett Millais

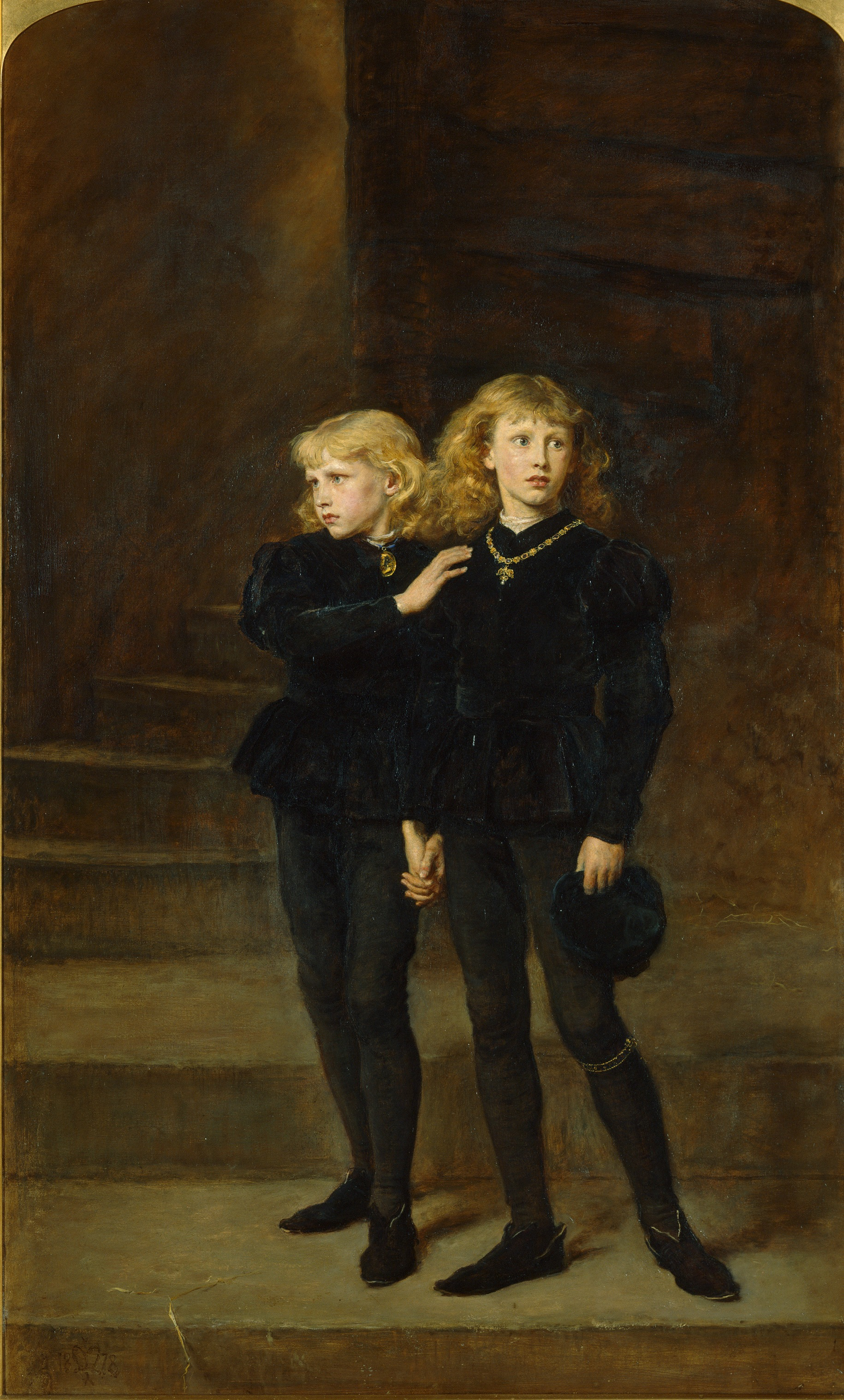
- Artist: John Everett Millais
- Year: 1878
- Type: Oil on canvas, history painting
- Dimensions: 147.2 cm × 91.4 cm (58.0 in × 36.0 in)
- Location: Royal Holloway College, Surrey

The Princes in the Tower is an 1878 history painting by the British artist John Everett Millais. It depicts the Princes in the Tower, Edward V and his younger brother Richard, Duke of York, in the Tower of London during the rule of their uncle Richard III. The scene drew heavily on William Shakespeare's tragedy Richard III and was a popular subject during the nineteenth century.

The painting was displayed at the Royal Academy Exhibition of 1878 at Burlington House in London. It was subsequently acquired by the art collector Thomas Holloway who donated it to Royal Holloway College. Millais produced a pendant painting Princess Elizabeth in Prison at St James's which is also in the collection at Royal Holloway.

An 1890 catalogue of Royal Holloway's picture collection identifies the models as the sons of Miss White, later Mrs Davis, a professional model who had sat for Millais's 1862 painting The White Cockade. According to Millais's son John, she took her sons to see Millais, who at once assigned to them the characters of the princes.

Other sources state Winifred Dallas-Yorke, later the Duchess of Portland, served as the model for the taller brother, her younger brother Charley the other, and that Millais offered to paint them after he saw them playing the princes in a tableau vivant.

== See also ==
- The Children of Edward, an 1830 painting by Paul Delaroche

== Bibliography ==
- Barlow, Paul. Time Present and Time Past: The Art of John Everett Millais. Routledge, 2017.
- Holloway, Verity. The Mighty Healer: Thomas Holloway's Victorian Patent Medicine Empire. Pen and Sword, 2016.
- Riding, Christine. John Everett Millais. Harry N. Abrams, 2006.
- Schoch, Richard W. Queen Victoria and the Theatre of Her Age. Palgrave Macmillan, 2004.
