= The Twins (Millais) =

Painting by John Everett Millais

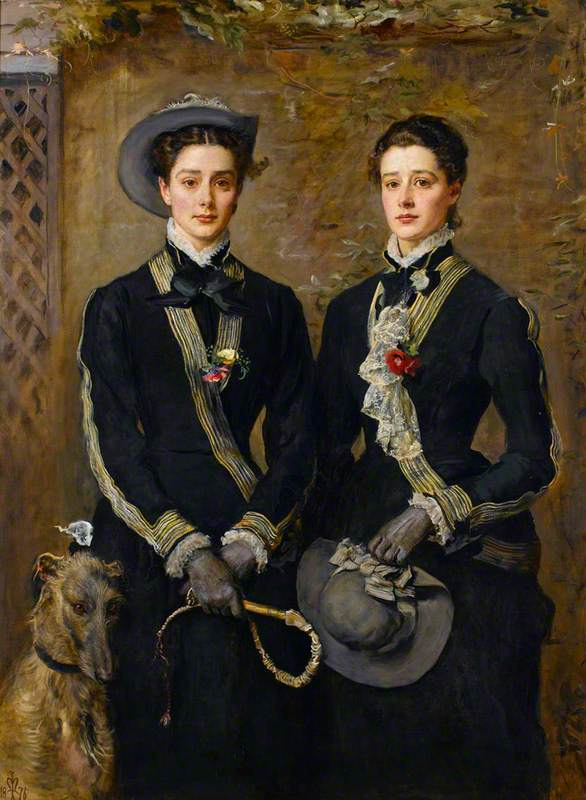
- Artist: John Everett Millais
- Year: 1876
- Type: Oil on canvas, genre painting
- Dimensions: 153.5 cm × 113.7 cm (60.4 in × 44.8 in)
- Location: Fitzwilliam Museum, Cambridge

The Twins is an 1876 portrait painting by the British artist John Everett Millais. It depicts the sisters Kate and Grace Hoare. Having made his reputation as a member of the Pre-Raphaelite movement, Millais subsequently broadened his output and produced fashionable portraits along with his other work. The picture was commissioned by the girls' parents to celebrate their twentieth birthday.

It was displayed at the Grosvenor Gallery Exhibition of 1878 in London. Today the painting is in the collection of the Fitzwilliam Museum in Cambridge, having been acquired in 2005 through the acceptance in lieu scheme.

== See also ==
- List of paintings by John Everett Millais

== Bibliography ==
- Ellis, Andrew & Roe, Sonia. Oil Paintings in Public Ownership in Cambridgeshire: The Fitzwilliam Museum.
