= The Wolf's Den (Millais) =

Painting by John Everett Millais

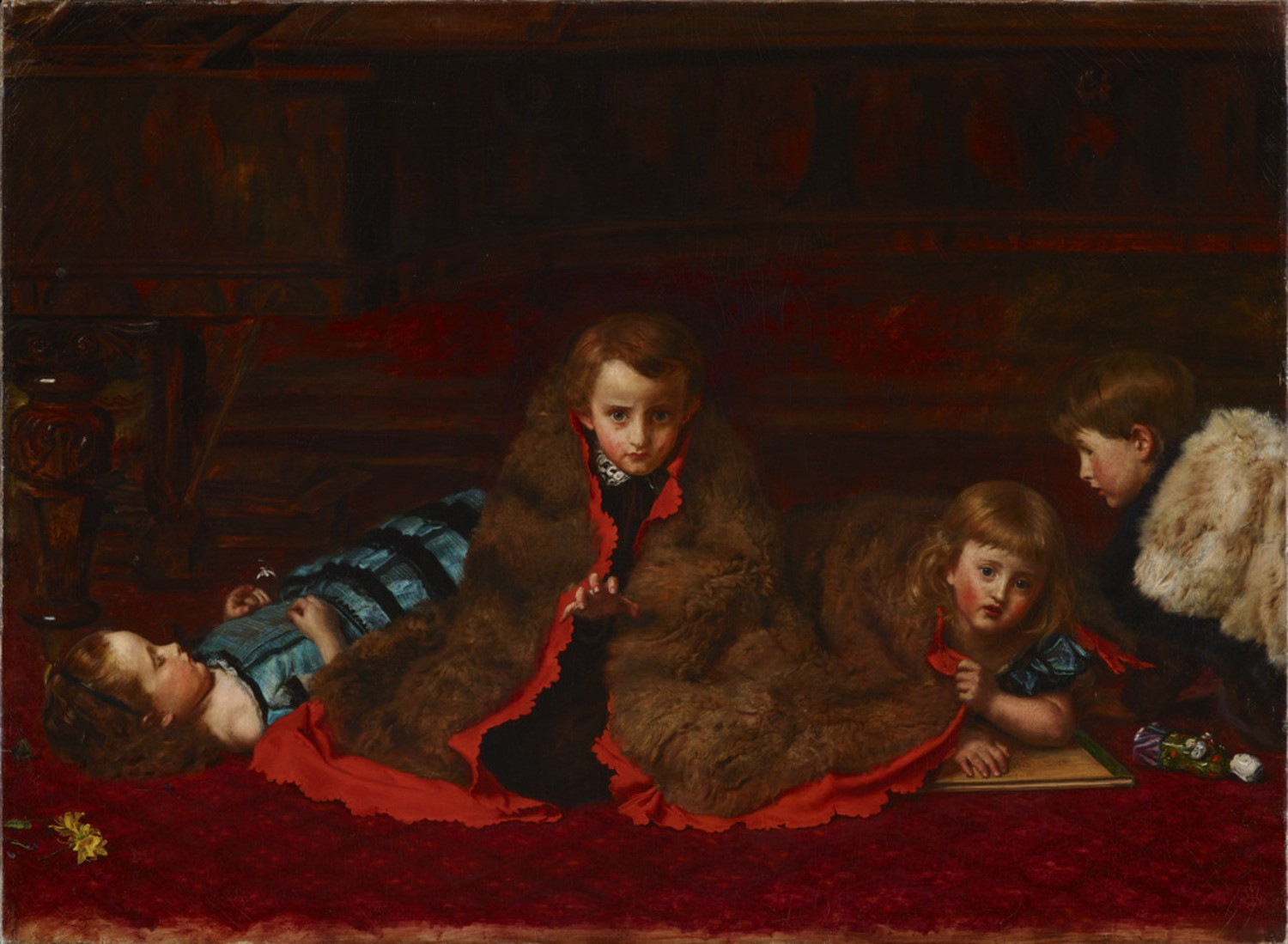
- Artist: John Everett Millais
- Year: 1862–63
- Type: Oil on canvas
- Dimensions: 83.8 cm × 114.3 cm (33.0 in × 45.0 in)
- Location: National Museum of Western Art, Tokyo

The Wolf's Den is an 1862–63 oil painting by the English artist John Everett Millais (1829–1896). It shows four children at play, either lying or crouching on the floor, with toys and flowers scattered around. The centrally positioned child, a boy, plays wolf by wearing a fur rug with a red material fringe; he looks directly at the viewer. It is signed with Millais' monogram and dated 1863.

== The painting ==
This was one of several paintings Millais made of his children. He began it in 1862 and finished it the following year. It shows his oldest four children, Everett, George, Effie and Mary, who are

are all seen together (their first appearance as a group), playing at "wild animals." Arrayed in wolf-skins, the children are emerging from the recesses under the grand piano.

The painting was featured in the Royal Academy Exhibition of 1863, catalogue number 498. Critic Marion Spielmann wrote of the painting in 1898:

There is forcible, brilliant, and solid painting, with a quaint harmony of contrasted scarlet and crimson. But there is an air of make-believe about the picture; the children are not really enjoying their game, and there is no such charm in it as pervades Millais's other picture of children playing on the floor - "Leisure Hours".

The painting entered a private collection in Japan in c. 1920, and remained in private ownership in Japan until October 2020, when it was purchased by the National Museum of Western Art, Tokyo.

== See also ==
- List of paintings by John Everett Millais
