= Portrait of John Hare =

Painting by John Everett Millais

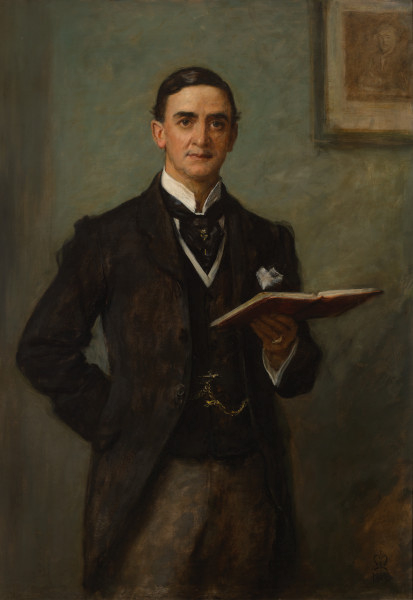
- Artist: John Everett Millais
- Year: 1893
- Type: Oil on canvas, portrait painting
- Dimensions: 124.5 cm × 86.4 cm (49.0 in × 34.0 in)
- Location: Garrick Club, London

Portrait of John Hare is a 1893 oil on canvas portrait painting by the artist John Everett Millais featuring the English actor and theatre manager John Hare . At the time Hare was the actor-manager of the Garrick Theatre in London's West End. He is shown in the green room of the Garrick. In the background is a framed print based on a portrait of David Garrick by Joshua Reynolds, suggesting the continuity between the two great theatrical figures.

Millais was one of the leading figures in British art who produced a number of portraits of prominent national figures during the latter years of his career. The painting was displayed at the Royal Academy Exhibition of 1893 held at Burlington House in London. Today it is part of the collection of the Garrick Club, having been presented by the long-standing member Hare in 1921. A photogravure was produced based on the painting and issued as a print of the well-known actor-manager.

== See also ==
- List of paintings by John Everett Millais

== Bibliography ==
- Fleming, Gordon H. John Everett Millais: A Biography. Constable, 1998.
