= Portrait of Wilkie Collins =

Painting by John Everett Millais

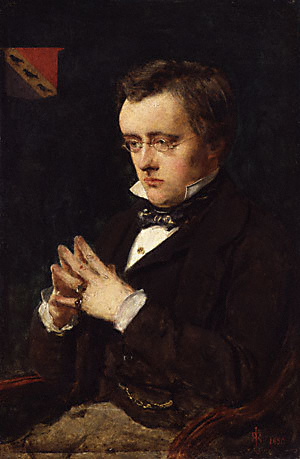
- Artist: John Everett Millais
- Year: 1850
- Type: Oil on panel, portrait painting
- Dimensions: 26.7 cm × 17.8 cm (10.5 in × 7.0 in)
- Location: National Portrait Gallery; London

Portrait of Wilkie Collins is an 1850 portrait painting by the British artist John Everett Millais depicting the writer Wilkie Collins. Collins later became a popular novelist producing works such as The Woman in White (1860) and The Moonstone but was at the beginning of his career when he posed for this portrait. he two men were friends and the sitter's brother Charles Allston Collins was a member of the Pre-Raphaelite Brotherhood along with Millais.

The painting shows the influence of Netherlandish art, and features a family coat of arms in the top left corner. The picture is today in the collection of the National Portrait Gallery in London. It was acquired in 1894 after the director George Scharf established with Millais that the painting was genuine.

== See also ==
- List of paintings by John Everett Millais

== Bibliography ==
- Barlow, Paul. Time Present and Time Past: The Art of John Everett Millais. Routledge, 2017.
- Gasson, Andrew & Peters, Catherine. Wilkie Collins; An Illustrated Guide. Oxford University Press, 1998.
- Grilli, Stephanie Jeanne. Pre-Raphaelite Portraiture, 1848–1854. Yale University, 1980.
- Marsh, Jan. The Pre-Raphaelite Circle. National Portrait Gallery, 2005.
