= The White Cockade (Millais painting) =

Painting by John Everett Millais

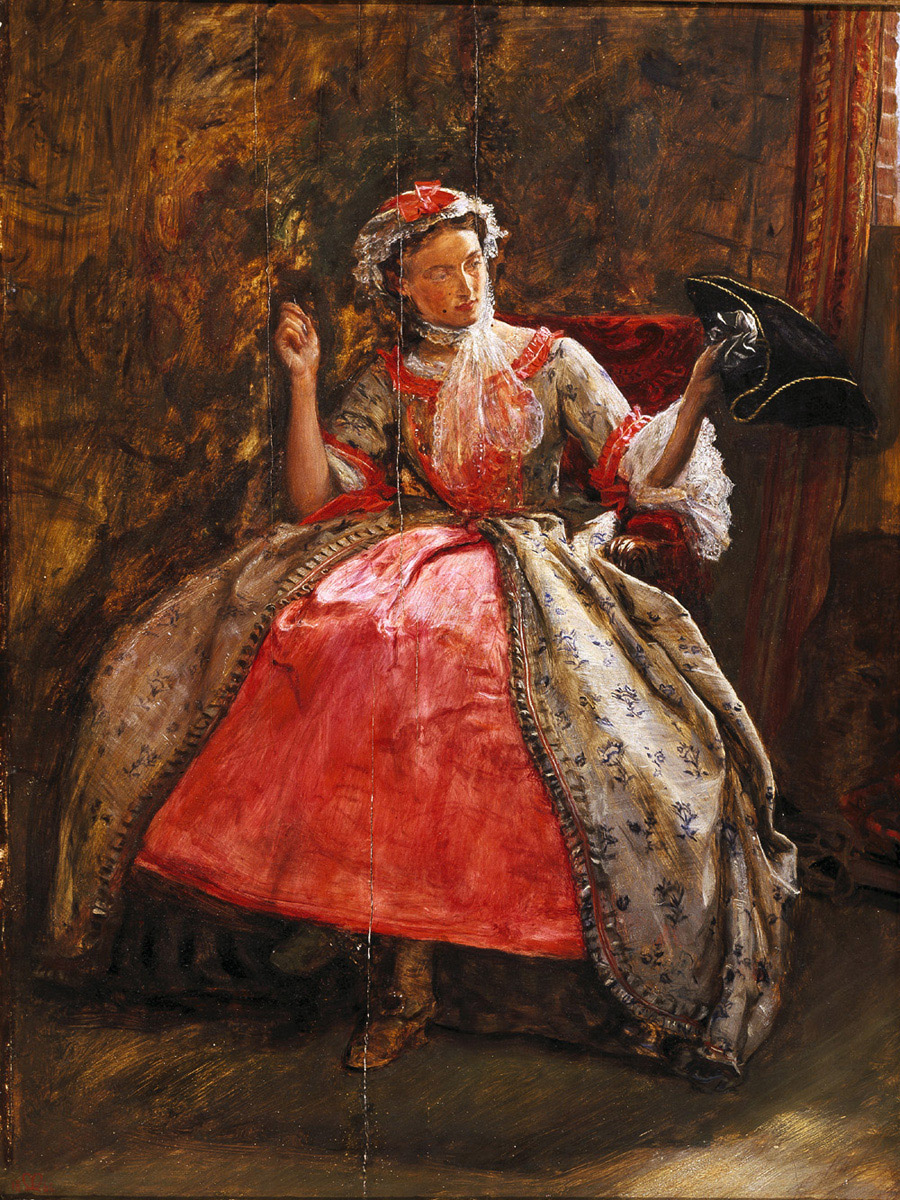
- Artist: John Everett Millais
- Year: 1862
- Type: Oil on panel
- Dimensions: 61 cm × 45.1 cm (24 in × 17.8 in)
- Location: Delaware Art Museum; Wilmington

The White Cockade is an 1862 oil painting by the English artist John Everett Millais (1829–1896). It shows a seated young woman in a sumptuous 18th-century dress, sewing a white cockade (a knot of ribbons) onto a tricorn hat. It is signed with Millais' monogram and dated 1862.

== The painting ==
Millais was interested in Scottish history, especially following his marriage in 1855 to Scotswoman Effie Gray (1828–1897), and subsequently living in Scotland for large parts of each year. He was particularly attracted to the period during which the Jacobites attempted to restore the House of Stuart to the British throne. The cockade (a knot of ribbons) signified the wearer's loyalty to the Stuarts.

Millais was working on the painting in the spring of 1862. Effie was the model, and the Millais' son John Guille Millais (1865–1931) considered it "an excellent portrait of her at that time".

The painting was exhibited in a special Winter Exhibition at the Royal Academy, London, held between January and March 1898, which featured many collected works of the late Millais. It was catalogue number 60, and at this time was owned by Stuart M. Samuel, Esq. Marion Spielmann wrote of the painting:

For grace and elegance unsurpassed by Millais at this period; and in colour, "like molten jewels", one of his most brilliant works.

The painting joined the collection of Delaware Art Museum, Wilmington, Delaware in 1935, as part of the Samuel and Mary R. Bancroft Memorial.

== See also ==
- List of paintings by John Everett Millais
