= The Bridesmaid (painting) =

Painting by John Everett Millais

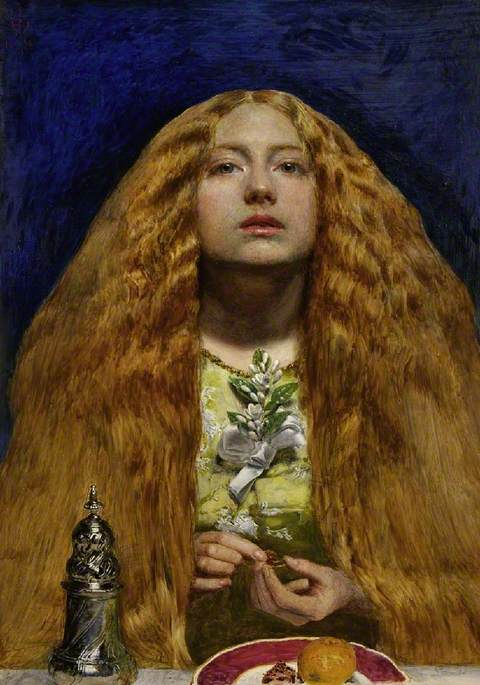
- Artist: John Everett Millais
- Year: 1851
- Type: Oil on canvas, genre painting
- Dimensions: 27.9 cm × 20.3 cm (11.0 in × 8.0 in)
- Location: Fitzwilliam Museum, Cambridge

The Bridesmaid is an 1851 oil painting by the British artist John Everett Millais. It depicts a young woman, having served as a bridesmaid, passing a piece of wedding cake through a ring nine times. These were traditional gestures in the belief they would show an image of a husband for her in the near future. In front of her are a piece of wedding cake and an orange on a plate. The orange blossom on her dress signifies purity, innocence and chastity. According to the Journal of the Pre-Raphaelite Brotherhood of 9 February 1851, the model was Miss McDowell.

Millais had emerged as both a founder and one of the leading Pre-Raphaelite artists during the mid-nineteenth century. Today the painting is in the collection of the Fitzwilliam Museum in Cambridge, having been acquired in 1889.

Millais painted another painting with the same title in 1879.

== See also ==
- List of paintings by John Everett Millais

== Bibliography ==
- Barringer, Tim. Reading the Pre-Raphaelites. Yale University Press, 1999.
- Prettlejohn, Elizabeth. The Cambridge Companion to the Pre-Raphaelites. Cambridge University Press, 2012.
