= Private Collection =

Private Collection may refer to:

- Private collection, a privately owned collection of works, usually a collection of art
- Private Collection (film), a 1972 Australian film
- Private Collection (fragrance), a 1973 fragrance by Estée Lauder
- Private Collection (Jon and Vangelis album), 1983
- Private Collection: 1979–1988, a 1988 compilation album by Cliff Richard
- The Private Collection, a 2000 album by Charlie Haden
- Private Collection (Miki Howard album), 2008
