= A Huguenot, on St. Bartholomew's Day =

Painting by John Everet Millais

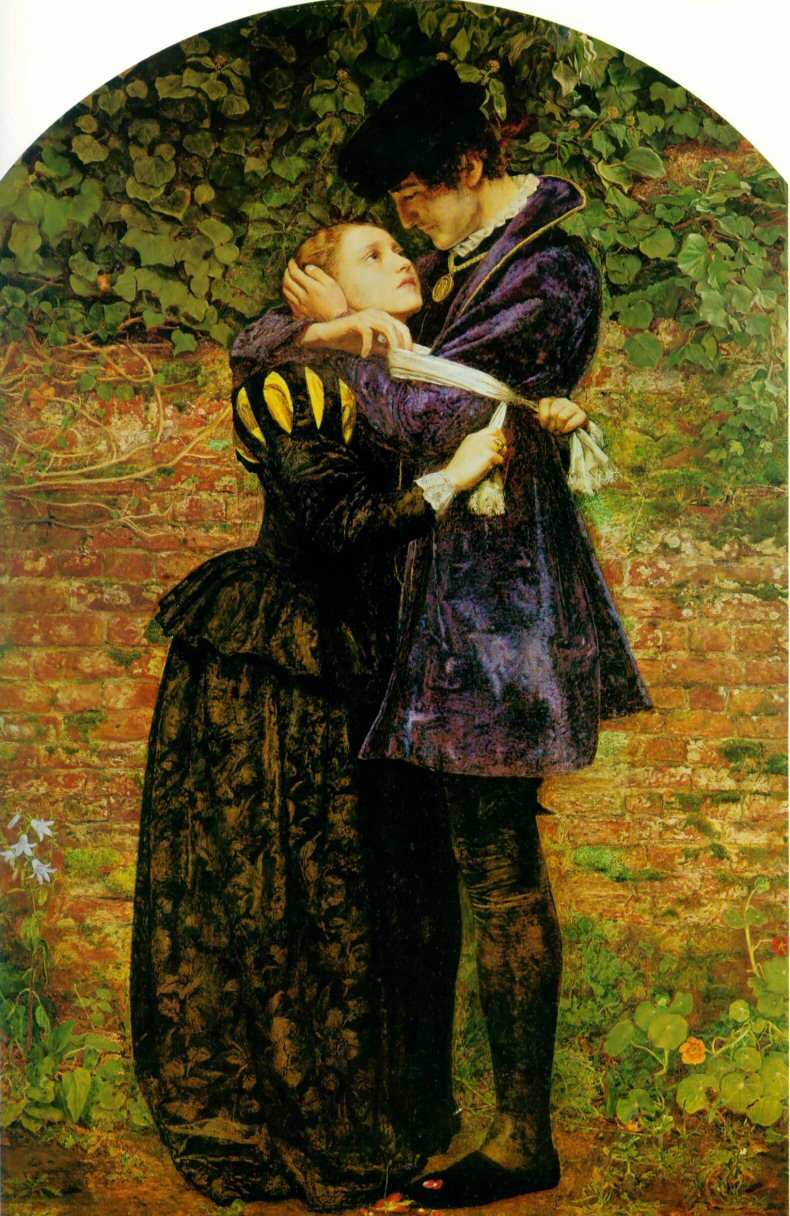
- Artist: John Everett Millais
- Year: 1851–52
- Medium: Oil on canvas
- Dimensions: 92.71 cm × 64.13 cm (36.5 in × 25.25 in)
- Location: Private collection: The Makins Collection

A Huguenot, on St. Bartholomew's Day, Refusing to Shield Himself from Danger by Wearing the Roman Catholic Badge is the full, exhibited title of a painting by John Everett Millais, created in 1851–52.

== History and description ==
It was produced at the height of his Pre-Raphaelite period. It was accompanied, at the Royal Academy of Arts in London in 1852, with a long quote reading: "When the clock of the Palais de Justice shall sound upon the great bell, at daybreak, then each good Catholic must bind a strip of white linen round his arm, and place a fair white cross in his cap.—The order of the Duke of Guise." This long title is usually abbreviated to A Huguenot or A Huguenot, on St Bartholomew's Day.

It depicts a pair of young lovers and is given a dramatic twist because the woman, who is Catholic, is attempting to get her beloved, who is Protestant, to wear the white armband declaring allegiance to Catholicism. The young man firmly pulls off the armband at the same time that he gently embraces his lover, and stares into her pleading eyes. The incident refers to the St. Bartholomew's Day massacre on August 24, 1572, when around 3,000 French Protestants (Huguenots) were murdered in Paris, with around 20,000 massacred across the rest of France. A small number of Protestants escaped from the city through subterfuge by wearing white armbands.

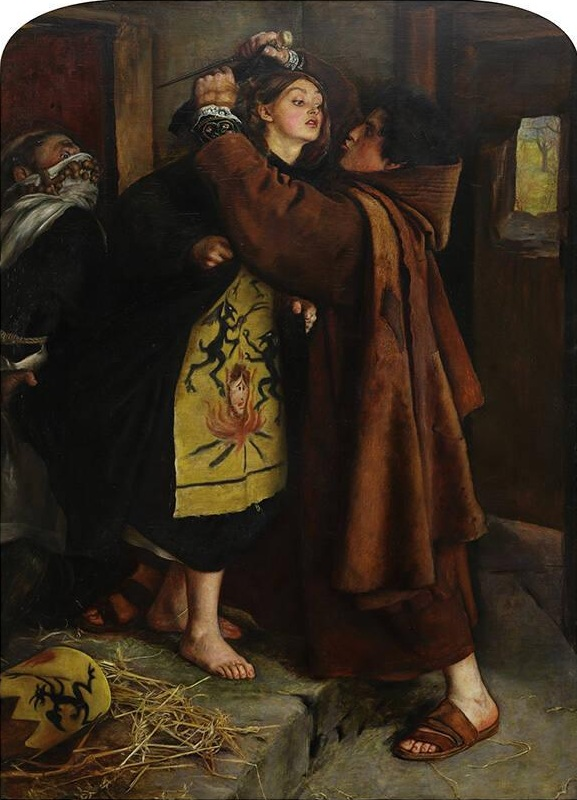
The Escape of a Heretic, 1559, painted by Millais in 1856–57, was intended as a pendant (companion piece) to A Huguenot, on St. Bartholomew's Day.

Millais had initially planned simply to depict lovers in a less dire predicament, but supposedly had been persuaded by his Pre-Raphaelite colleague William Holman Hunt that the subject was too trite. After seeing Giacomo Meyerbeer's opera Les Huguenots of 1836 at Covent Garden, which tells the story of the massacre, Millais adapted the painting to refer to the event. In the opera, Valentine attempts unsuccessfully to get her lover Raoul to wear the armband. The choice of a pro-Protestant subject was also significant because the Pre-Raphaelites had previously been attacked for their alleged sympathies to the Oxford Movement and to Catholicism.

Millais painted the majority of the background near Ewell in Surrey in the late summer and autumn of 1851, while he and Hunt were living at Worcester Park Farm. It was from a brick wall adjoining an orchard. Some of the flowers depicted in the scene may have been chosen because of the contemporary interest in the so-called language of flowers. The blue Canterbury Bells at the left, for example, can stand for faith and constancy. Returning to London after the weather turned too cold to work out-of-doors in November, he painted in the figures: the face of the man was from that of Millais's family friend Arthur Lemprière, and the woman was posed for by Anne Ryan.

Millais intended his later painting, The Escape of a Heretic, 1559, of 1856–57 to be a pendant (companion piece) to A Huguenot, on St. Bartholomew's Day.

== Reception ==
The painting was exhibited with Ophelia and his portrait of Mrs. Coventry Patmore (Fitzwilliam Museum, Cambridge) at the Royal Academy of Arts in 1852, and helped to change attitudes towards the Pre-Raphaelites. Tom Taylor wrote an extremely positive review in Punch. It was produced as a reproductive print by the dealer D. White and engraved in mezzotint by Thomas Oldham Barlow in 1856. This became Millais's first major popular success in this medium, and the artist went on to produce a number of other paintings on similar subjects to serve a growing middle class market for engravings. These include The Order of Release, 1746 (Tate, London), The Proscribed Royalist, 1651 (Andrew Lloyd-Webber Collection), and The Black Brunswicker (Lady Lever Art Gallery, Port Sunlight). All were successfully engraved.

There are smaller watercolour versions of the picture in The Higgins Art Gallery, Bedford, the Fogg Art Museum, Harvard University, and a reduced oil replica in the Andrew Lloyd-Webber Collection, all by Millais.

The painting is part of the privately-owned Makins Collection.

== See also ==
- List of paintings by John Everett Millais
