= The Wedding Cards =

Painting by John Everett Millais

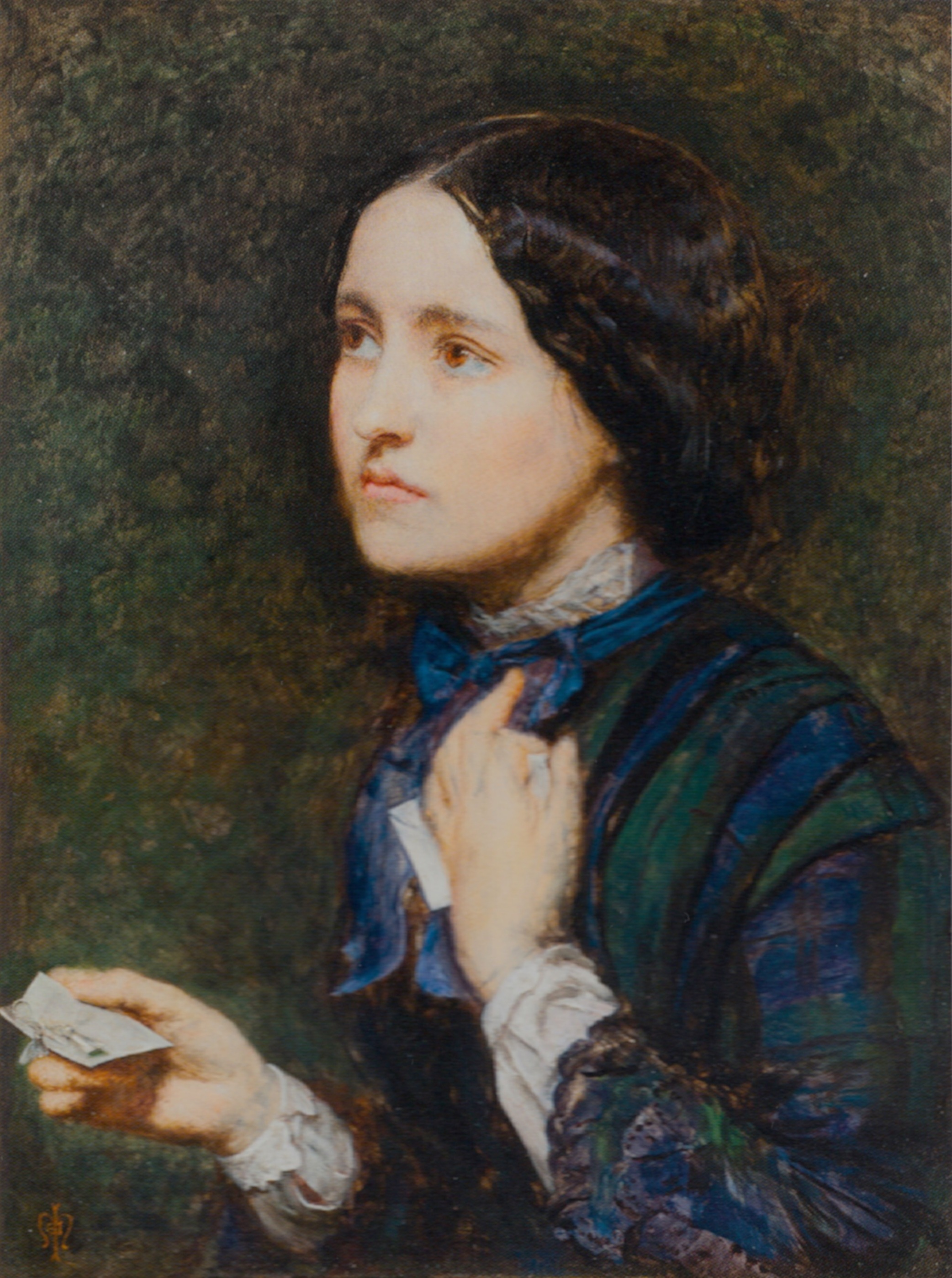
- Artist: John Everett Millais
- Year: 1854
- Type: Oil on panel
- Dimensions: 22.2 cm × 16.5 cm (8.7 in × 6.5 in)
- Location: Private collection

The Wedding Cards or Wedding Cards: Jilted is an 1854 oil painting by the English artist John Everett Millais. It shows a woman holding a card in one hand and the envelope in the other, which she rests against her chest. It is a small, intimate painting of a woman against a dark background, like many of the paintings Millais produced in 1854.

== The painting ==
The painting references the Victorian habit of newly-wed couples sending out "wedding cards", to announce that they were "at home" to receive congratulatory visits from friends. Christopher Newall writes of the pose: "...her ringless left hand symbolically clasped to her heart, together with her sad expression, suggest all is not well."

The painting was first exhibited at the Liverpool Academy of Arts in 1854. It was bought by John Miller, a Liverpool-based Scottish collector of Pre-Raphaelite works, and in 1857 Miller lent it to the exhibition of Pre-Raphaelite art in Russell Place in London. In 1858 The Wedding Cards was included in the sale of Miller's art collection. In 1862 it was included in a sale of the collection of Thomas Plint, who had died the year before, where it sold for 120 guineas.

The picture has changed hands at least eleven times since it was painted. London West End art dealer Thomas Agnew & Sons has bought the painting four times: twice in the 1800s and twice in the 1900s.

The painting was sold by Christie's on 6 June 1958 for 280 guineas. It was sold again by Christie's in London on 5 June 2008 (Lot 47), on behalf of the estate of Lord Blackford (Keith Alexander Henry Mason, 3rd Baron Blackford), who died in April 1977. It is now in a private collection.

== See also ==
- List of paintings by John Everett Millais
