= Work (painting) =

Painting by Ford Madox Brown

Work (Manchester)
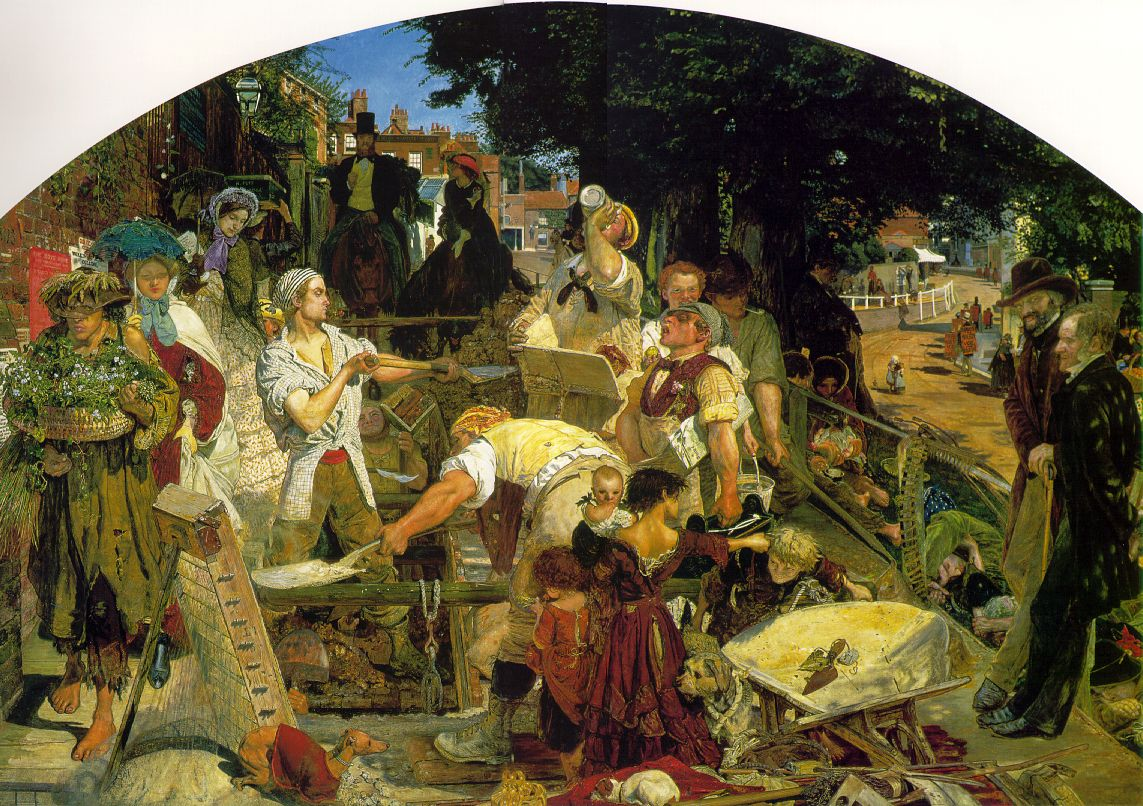
- Artist: Ford Madox Brown
- Year: 1865
- Medium: Oil on canvas
- Dimensions: 137 cm × 198 cm (53.9 in × 77.9 in)
- Location: Manchester Art Gallery, Manchester

Work (Birmingham)
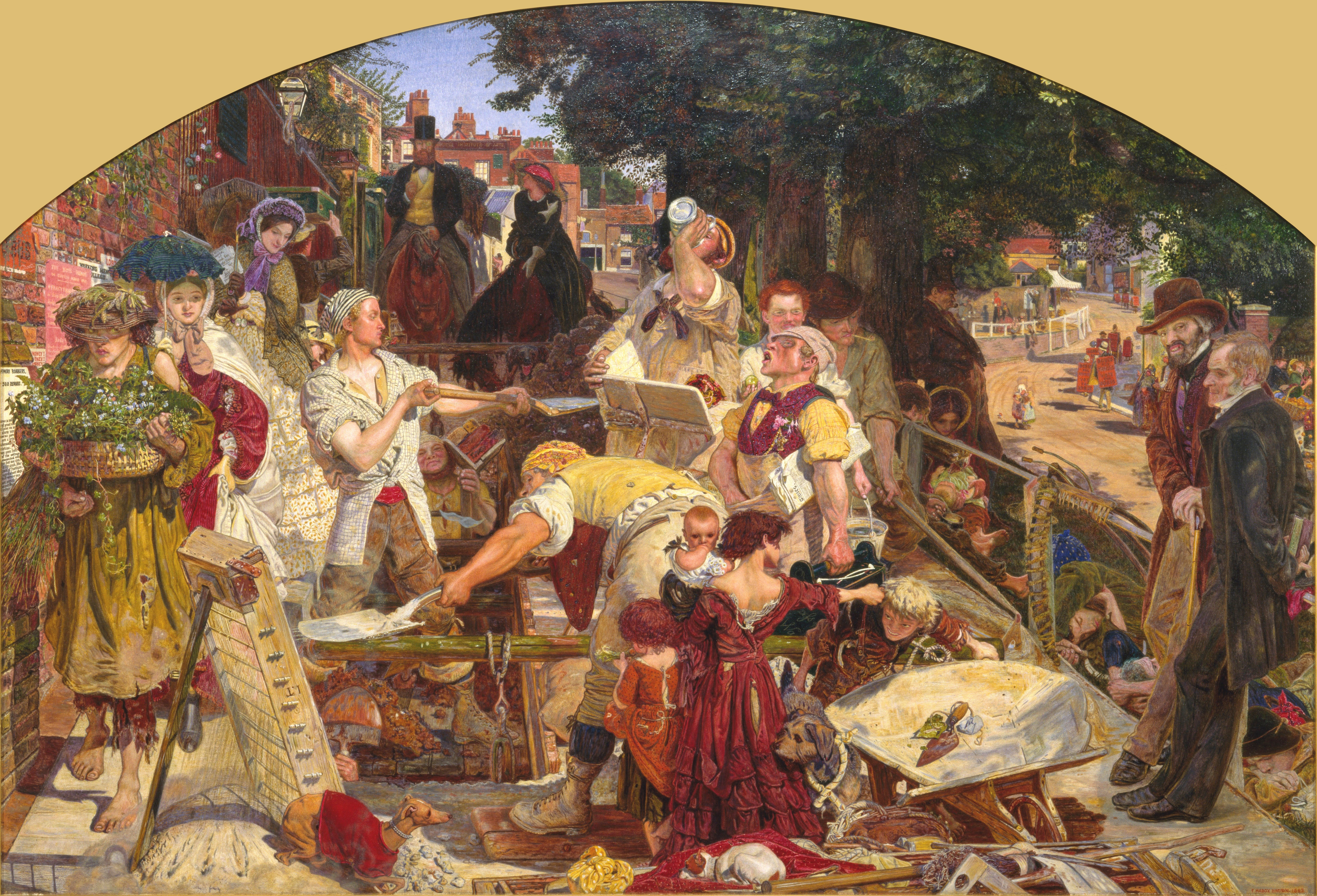
- Artist: Ford Madox Brown
- Year: 1863
- Medium: Oil on canvas
- Dimensions: 68.4 cm × 99.9 cm (26.9 in × 39.3 in)
- Location: Birmingham Museum and Art Gallery, Birmingham

Work (1852–1865) is a painting by Ford Madox Brown that is generally considered to be his most important achievement. It exists in two versions. The painting attempts to portray, both literally and analytically, the totality of the Victorian social system and the transition from a rural to an urban economy. Brown began the painting in 1852 and completed it in 1865, when he set up a special exhibition to show it along with several of his other works. He wrote a detailed catalogue explaining the significance of the picture.

The painting was commissioned by Thomas Plint, a well-known collector of Pre-Raphaelite art, who died before its completion. A second version, smaller at 684 × 990 mm, was commissioned in 1859 and completed in 1863. This is now in the Birmingham Museum and Art Gallery. It is closely similar, though for the lady with a blue parasol the face of Maria Leathart, the commissioner's wife, replaces that of Mrs Brown in the Manchester version.

The picture depicts a group of so-called "navvies" digging up the road to build a tunnel. It is typically assumed that this was part of the extensions of London's sewerage system, which were being undertaken to deal with the threat of typhus and cholera. The workers are in the centre of the painting. On either side of them are individuals who are either unemployed or represent the leisured classes. Behind the workers are two wealthy figures on horseback, whose progress along the road has been halted by the excavations.

The painting also portrays an election campaign, evidenced by posters and people carrying sandwich boards with the name of the candidate "Bobus". A poster also draws attention to the potential presence of a burglar.

The setting is an accurate depiction of The Mount on Heath Street in Hampstead, London, where a side road rises up above the main road and runs alongside it. Brown made a detailed study of the location in 1852.

== Background and influences ==
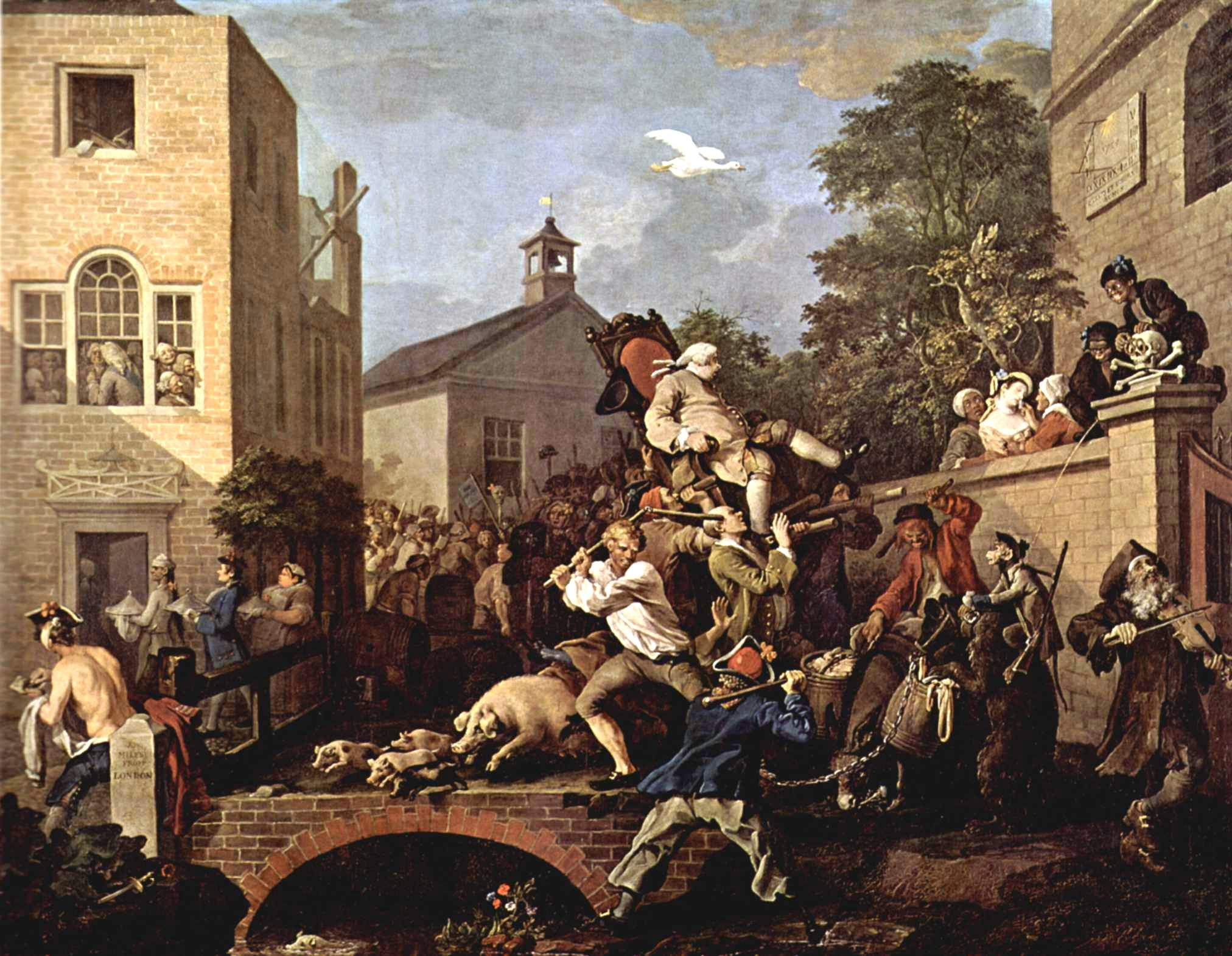
Hogarth, Humours of an Election: Chairing the Member. An MP is being carried by his supporters, while a Tory rural labourer and a Whig urban entertainer fight one another.

Brown explained that he had intended to demonstrate that the modern British workman could be as fit a subject for art as the more supposedly picturesque Italian lazarone (literally, the "mob," used to refer to the street people of Naples). He set the painting on Heath Street in Hampstead, of which he made a detailed study. Hampstead was at the time a wealthy area on the outskirts of London, which was undergoing rapid expansion. The development of the new sewerage and drainage systems in the city was also widely discussed in the press as an agent of modernisation. The character of "Bobus" appears in the writings of Thomas Carlyle as the epitome of a corrupt businessman who uses his money to market himself as a politician.

Brown's principal artistic model was the work of William Hogarth, in particular his paintings Humours of an Election and his prints Beer Street and Gin Lane. The Election paintings depicted both the vitality and the corruption of British society, while the prints set up a contrast between poverty and prosperity. While working on the painting Brown founded the Hogarth club to link artists who saw themselves as Hogarth's admirers and followers.

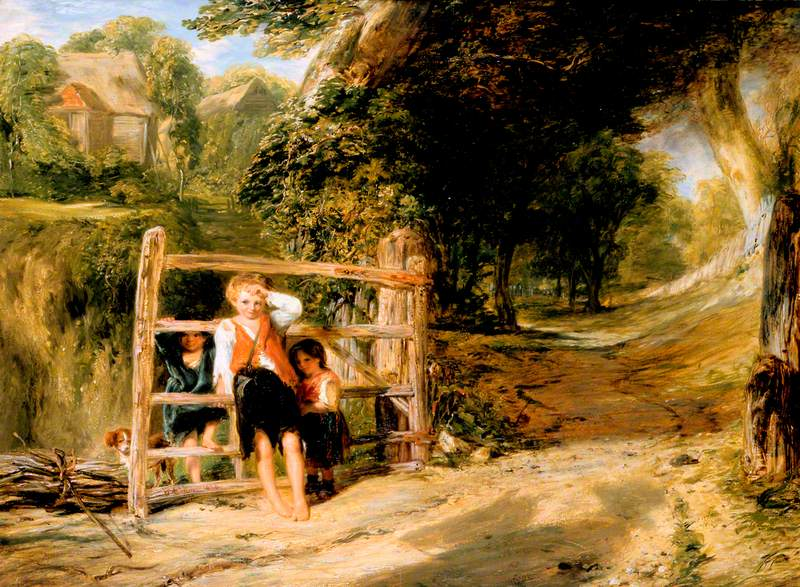
Rustic Civility (1833) by William Collins depicting a deferential social system and visual harmony. The boy is tugging his forelock to a passing member of the gentry on horseback (visible as a shadow).

The rustic aspects of the composition draw on the established tradition of the picturesque, epitomised by the work of artists such as John Constable and William Collins. The satirical and critical aspects of Hogarth's style work in tandem with Brown's Pre-Raphaelitism, with its intense concentration on the complication of the pictorial surface in conflicting details. This image of potentially violent and jarring confrontation is set in opposition to the social harmony and deference epitomised by the picturesque tradition.

== Characters and action ==
=== Workers ===
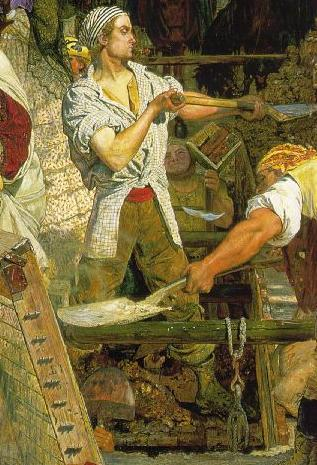
The young navvy (shovelling soil) and the older navvy (sieving quicklime)

The principal figure of the young workman is shovelling soil from a platform hanging in a hole onto a large pile behind him. Beneath him in the underground shaft another workman is digging the soil and shovelling it onto the platform. He is only visible in the form of a hand and a shovel appearing from the hole. To his right an older navvy is seen shovelling unsifted lime into a sieve. The fine powder accumulates in a pile on the left.

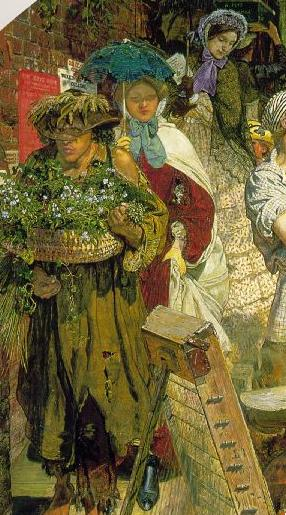
The flower seller; the fashionable lady, and the evangelist (left to right)

The lime is to be used to make mortar which is being mixed by other navvies at the right of the composition. A hodcarrier, visible behind the main navvy, is transporting bricks down into the hole. The sheet floating in front of him is a copy of a religious tract handed to him by the lady in the blue bonnet at the left, who is attempting to evangelise the navvies. She is carrying copies of a tract called The Hodman's Haven or Drink for Thirsty Souls. The reference to "drink" in the title reflects the emergence of the temperance movement. A navvy on the right, swigging beer, emphasises their rejection of teetotalism. The woman in front of the evangelist represents genteel glamour – a fashionable lady whose only "job" is to look beautiful.

The ragged character on the left in front of the fashionable lady represents the opposite end of the social scale: an itinerant chickweed seller who lives in a flophouse in Flower and Dean Street, Whitechapel, the most notoriously criminalised part of London at the time. He is an urban worker who obtained flowers, reeds and small animals from the countryside to sell in the centre of the city. Such workers had been chronicled in Henry Mayhew's book London Labour and the London Poor. Brown's catalogue describes the character in Work as a man of "effeminate gentleness" but afflicted with paranoia. The man's head is covered with straw, the wearing of which is frequently a symbol of madness in art.

All these figures are passing by the workers along a narrow pathway which brings them up against the sifted lime powder, a corrosive which symbolises the cleansing assault on their complacent rejection of useful work.

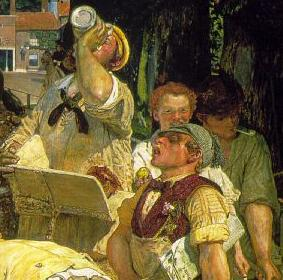
The countryman (left) and the beer seller (right)

In the centre of the composition is a countryman who has recently moved to the town, identifiable by his rural smock. He is holding a brick-hod and drinking beer supplied by the man in the red waistcoat who is supposed to be a "bouncer" employed in a local pub. The beer seller's costume includes examples of cheap brummagem jewellery. His persona – including a copy of The Times under his arm – is a pastiche of a gentleman-flaneur. The two men behind him are imported Irish labourers, recognisable by their costume. This aspect of the painting is directly influenced by Hogarth's Beer Street.

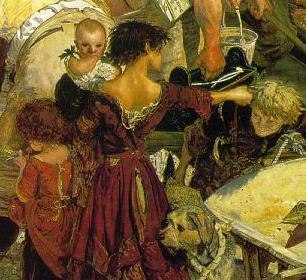
The ragamuffin children

In the foreground are a group of ragged children who have recently suffered a bereavement, evidenced by the black band on the baby's arm. As Brown says in his description, their ragamuffin status suggests that it was their mother who died. The oldest child, wearing borrowed clothing too old for her, tries to control her wayward brother, who is playing with the navvies' wheelbarrow. The younger girl sucks a carrot in lieu of a dummy and looks into the hole created by the workers. Their mongrel pet dog challenges the fashionable lady's pet dog, because, writes Brown, he hates "minions of aristocracy in jackets". The baby, who looks challengingly out at the viewer, occupies a central position in the composition. Brown's description emphasises this challenge by suddenly moving from a first-person narrative to the second person – speaking to his fictional fashionable lady about the perilous situation of the impoverished children.

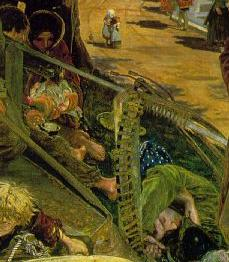
Unemployed labourers resting and sleeping on the embankment

On the embankment between the upper and the lower road a group of unemployed rural labourers are sleeping in uneasy postures. A scythe wrapped in protective rope hangs over the railing that separates the productive from the unproductive figures in the composition. The Irish couple by the tree are feeding their baby with gruel, while an older man stands by the tree looking resentful. This aspect of the painting recalls Carlyle's discussion of unemployed Irish migrants in his book Past and Present.

Beneath these figures on the road children can be seen playing, while genteel couples and sandwich-board carriers wander through the sun-dappled lower street. At the extreme right a policeman pushes a female orange seller who is resting her basket on a bollard (technically illegal, because she is setting up shop).

=== Intellectuals ===
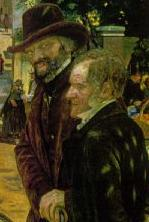
Thomas Carlyle (left) and F. D. Maurice

At the right the workers are being watched by two intellectuals who "seem to be idle but work". They are described as workers in their minds and as "the cause of well ordained work in others". In fact these are portraits of Thomas Carlyle and F. D. Maurice. The latter was the founder of Christian socialism; he established worker's educational institutions for which Brown worked. Carlyle was the main inspiration behind the picture. His books Past and Present and Latter-Day Pamphlets had criticised the laissez faire economic system and political corruption. He was known for his so-called "gospel of work", which described work as a form of worship. He wrote in Past and Present,

It has been written, 'an endless significance lies in Work;' a man perfects himself by working. Foul jungles are cleared away, fair seedfields rise instead, and stately cities; and withal the man himself first ceases to be a jungle and foul unwholesome desert thereby. Consider how, even in the meanest sorts of Labour, the whole soul of a man is composed into a kind of real harmony, the instant he sets himself to work! Doubt, Desire, Sorrow, Remorse, Indignation, Despair itself, all these like helldogs lie beleaguering the soul of the poor dayworker, as of every man: but he bends himself with free valour against his task, and all these are stilled, all these shrink murmuring far off into their caves. The man is now a man. The blessed glow of Labour in him, is it not as purifying fire, wherein all poison is burnt up, and of sour smoke itself there is made bright blessed flame!

In the same book Carlyle creates the character of Bobus Higgins, a corrupt sausage maker who uses horsemeat in his product to undercut competitors. In Latter-Day Pamphlets Bobus is portrayed as a populist manipulator who is going into politics. In the painting his agent appears behind Carlyle's head, prodding local "idlers" to walk through the streets carrying signs with his name on them. At the left a "Vote for Bobus" poster has been hit by a ball of mud or faeces and has "don't" chalked onto it.

=== Animals ===
There are multiple animals, mostly pet dogs, portrayed in the painting. The lower, central portion contains a tattered mongrel dog hanging around with the young children. This dog represents a pet that the lower class would have, a stray that would be there to keep the owner company. Brown refers to the dog as a "rugged democrat". Left of that there is a brown dog wearing a sweater, presumably owned, as Brown says, by the woman on the left with the blue parasol. This dog represents the wealthier upper-middle class of the society. The dog is there for companionship but also for play and to show off wealth. Brown says that the democratic dog "hates minions of aristocracy in red jackets." There is also a bulldog pup asleep near the workmen, implied to be a pet of one of the labourers. Finally on the upper central portion of the painting there is a large hunting dog owned by the most wealthy upper-class man and woman on the horses. This dog is purely bred to help hunt and the only people that are wealthy enough to go hunting, for game or sport. In the far background a dog is seen yapping at horses pulling a carriage, which is about to turn into the main street, hinting at potential disorder to come.

Animals are also referred to in the posters on the wall. A wanted poster for a burglar says that he is typically accompanied by a bulldog, and another poster advertises a lecture by "Professor Snoox" on the habits of cats. Two cats are seen on a roof. In his description Brown says that they "are denying his theory in toto".

== Composition and significance ==
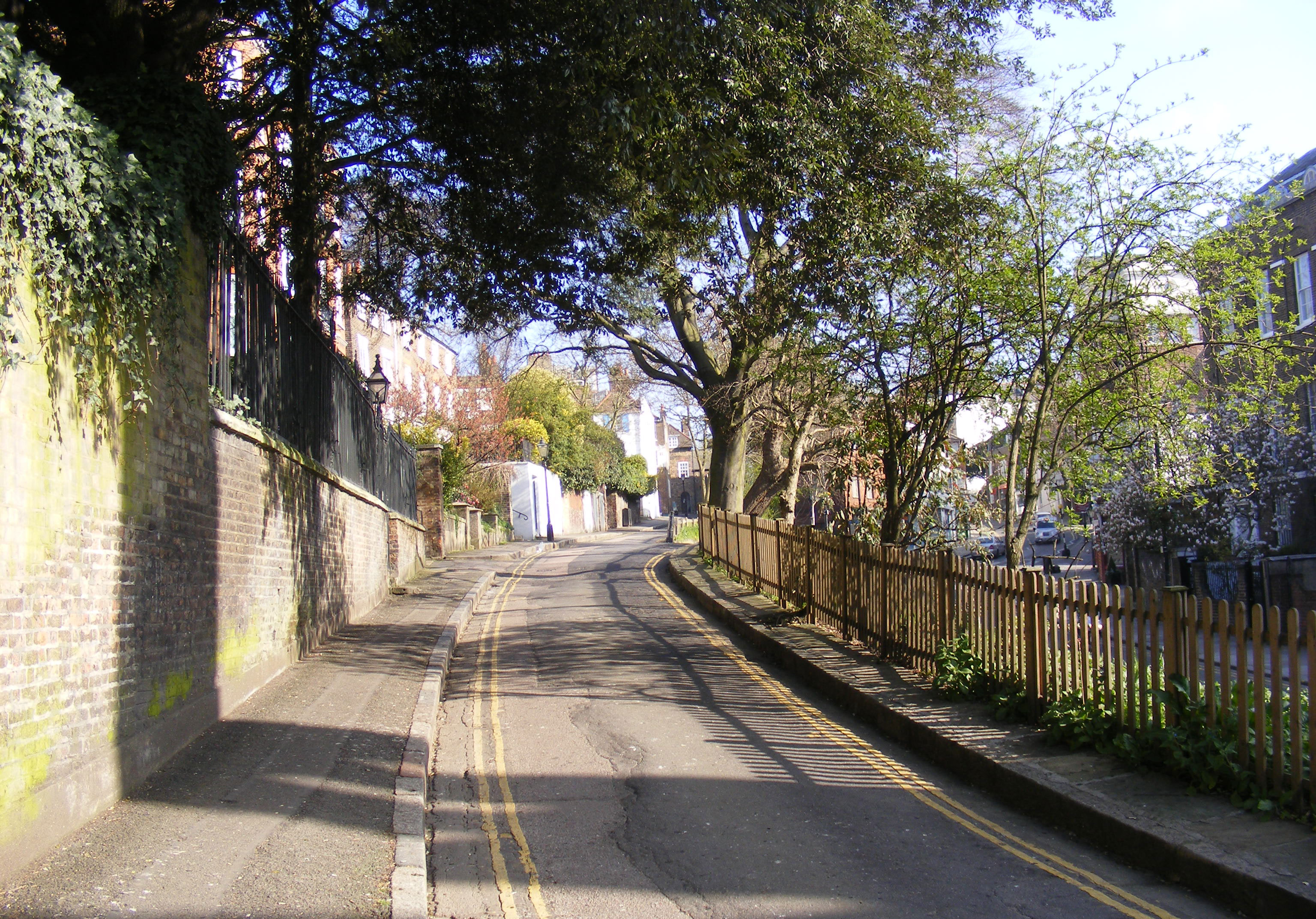
A current day view of The Mount, Heath Street: the location used for Work

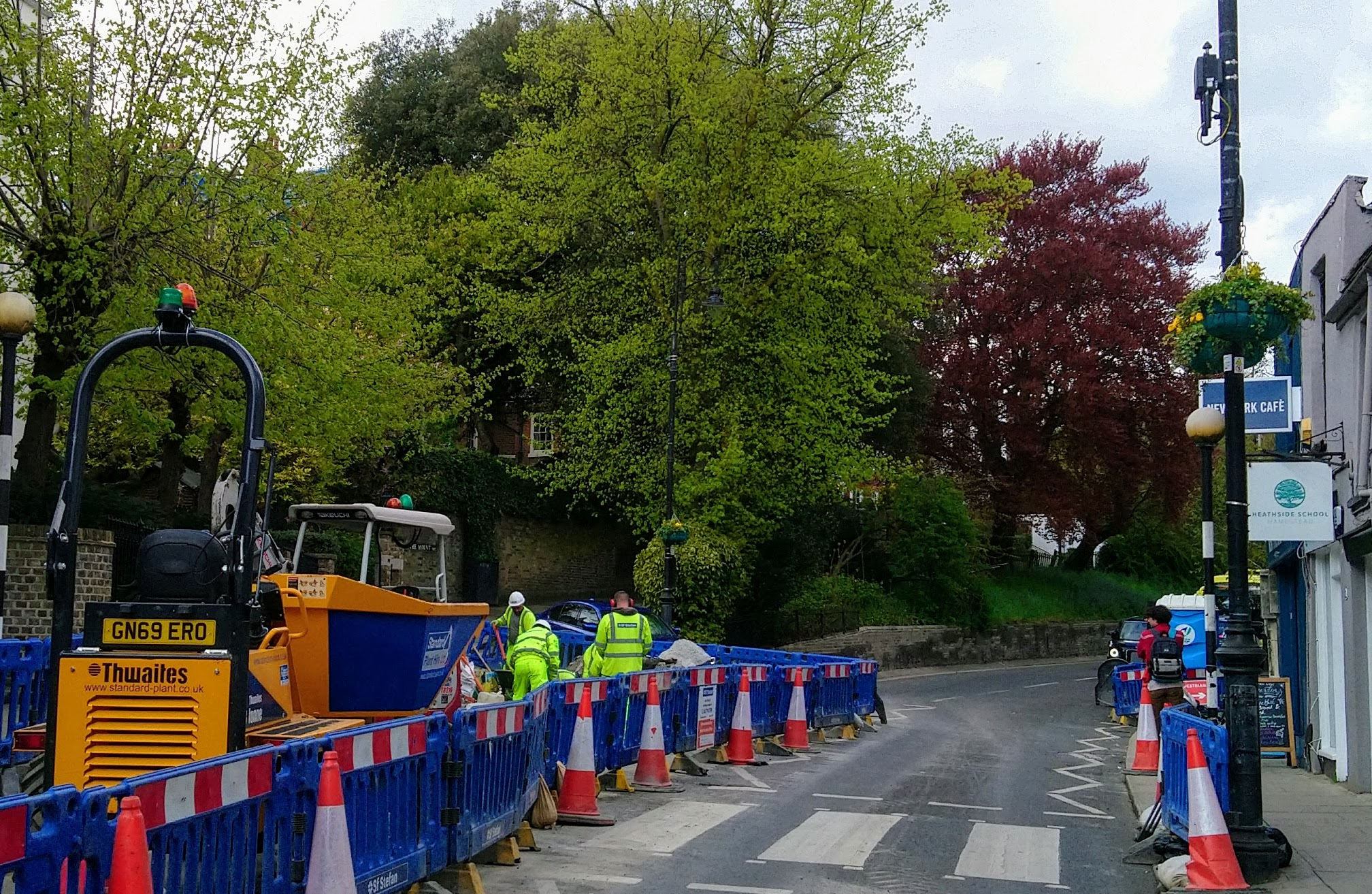
Road works at The Mount, Hampstead, May 2021

The painting is structured by the increasing compression of space from right to left, as the rural relaxation on the right side is replaced by the concentrated labour in the middle and the urban crush on the far left. The workers in the centre break up the established relationship between the characters, throwing people together in new ways. Brown reproduces the common triangular structure of the social system, with the horse-riding aristocrats at the top. But they are pushed to the back, stuck and unable to progress – forced into the shade in the background, while the workers occupy the brightly lit foreground. The railings around the excavations separate the realm of productive work from that of leisure, lassitude and unproductive work.

As with most Pre-Raphaelite paintings the composition minimises chiaroscuro and accumulates motifs in deliberately confusing abundance, containing numerous Hogarthian sub-episodes within the main image (a man washing windows; a dog worrying horses leading a carriage etc.). The composition is also used to dramatically crop figures and motifs which complicates the legibility of space (the hand emerging from the hole; the cropped figures behind the intellectuals' head). Carlyle's smile links the viewer in a paradoxical engagement with the re-working process depicted.

== See also ==
- List of paintings by Ford Madox Brown
