= The Black Brunswicker =

Painting by John Everett Millais

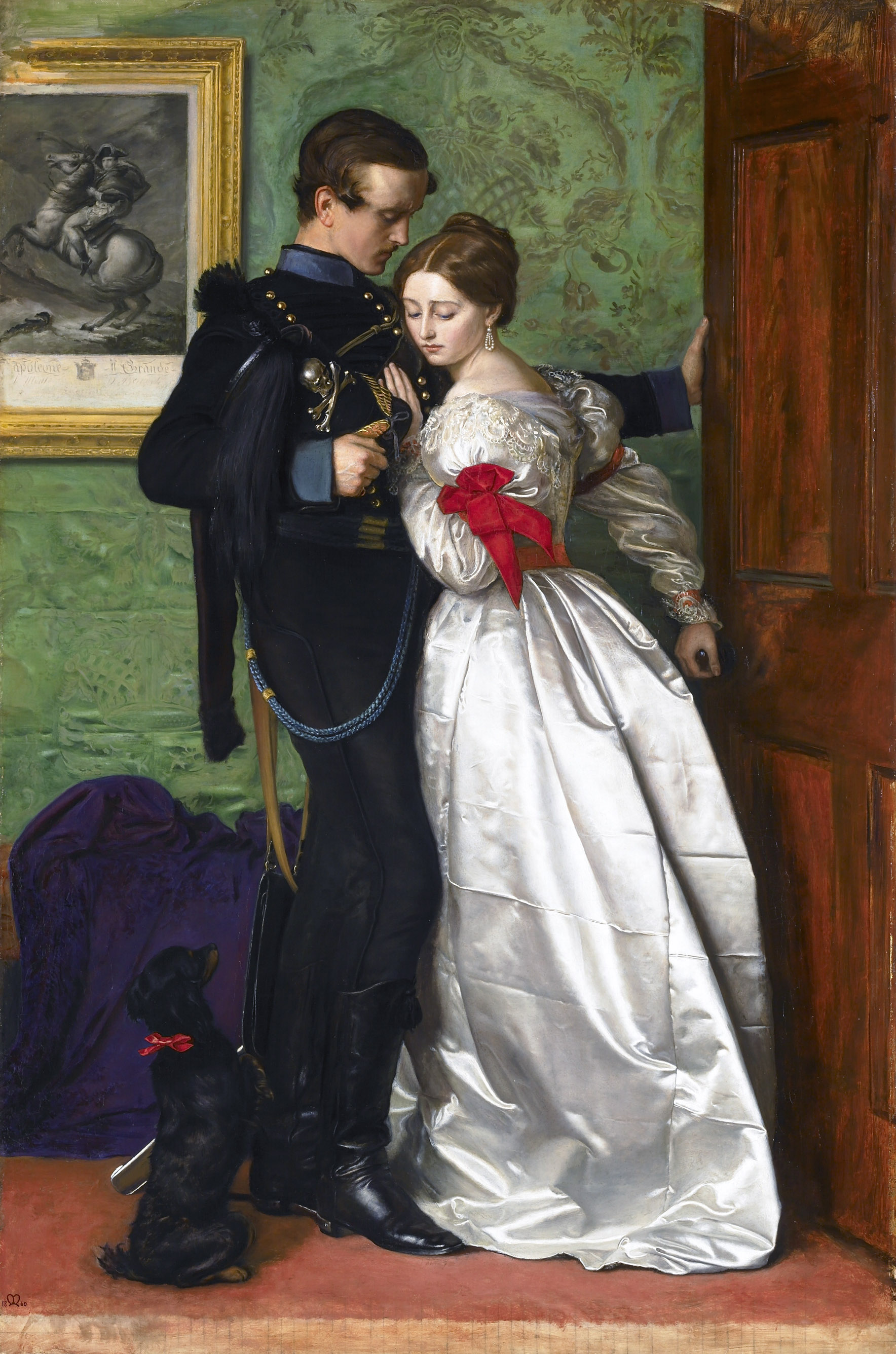
- Artist: John Everett Millais
- Year: 1860
- Medium: Oil on canvas
- Dimensions: 104 cm × 68.5 cm (41 in × 27.0 in)
- Location: Lady Lever Art Gallery, Port Sunlight, Merseyside

The Black Brunswicker (1860) is a painting by John Everett Millais. It was inspired in part by the exploits of the Black Brunswickers, a German volunteer corps of the Napoleonic Wars, during the Waterloo campaign and in part by the contrasts of black broadcloth and pearl-white satin in a moment of tender conflict.

== Subject ==
The painting depicts a Brunswicker about to depart for battle. His sweetheart, wearing a ballgown, restrains him, trying to push the door closed, while he pulls it open. This suggests that the scene is inspired by the Duchess of Richmond's ball on 15 June 1815, from which the officers departed to join troops at the Battle of Quatre Bras. The woman's dog, wearing a red ribbon like its mistress, looks on attentively.

In a letter to his wife, Effie Gray, Millais described his inspiration for the work, referring to a conversation with William Howard Russell, the war correspondent of The Times:

My subject appears to me, too, most fortunate, and Russell thinks it first-rate. It is connected with the Brunswick Cavalry at Waterloo...They were nearly annihilated but performed prodigies of valour... I have it all in my mind's eye and feel confident that it will be a prodigious success. The costume and incident are so powerful that I am astonished it has never been touched upon before. Russell was quite struck with it, and he is the best man for knowing the public taste. Nothing could be kinder than his interest, and he is to set about getting all the information that is required.

The same letter states that he intends it to be "a perfect pendant to The Huguenot", Millais's first major success, which portrays a similar scene featuring two lovers gazing at each other longingly. Originally Millais intended the two paintings to be even more similar than they are by repeating the motif of the armband used in the earlier painting. He wanted the soldier to be wearing a black crepe mourning armband, with "the sweetheart of the young soldier sewing it around his arm". The armband idea was quickly dropped as it does not appear in any extant preparatory drawings.

Millais reduced the presence of Napoleon to an engraving after Jacques-Louis David's Napoleon Crossing the Alps, which is framed on the damask-hung wall, and which "perplexed the critics with the possible intricacies of cross purposes and rival jealousies" according to the reviewer from Blackwood's Edinburgh Magazine. This refers to the fact that some critics took the print to imply that the female character was an admirer of Napoleon, and so she was trying to prevent her lover from joining the army for both personal and political reasons. As the critic of The Times surmised, "her reluctance is due in part to a romantic admiration for this great conquerer [sic?]." Other critics suggest the print was intended to allude to both the Waterloo campaign and to more recent events, particularly Napoleon III's repetition of his predecessor's crossing of the Alps by his attack on Austrian-controlled Lombardy in 1859.

== Creation and reception ==
The artwork took an estimated three months to paint. Millais was reported to have paid particularly close attention to the correctness of the Brunswicker's uniform. Charles Dickens' auburn-haired daughter Kate Perugini modelled for the woman seen in the picture. The male model was an anonymous soldier who died from consumption shortly afterwards. The two models never actually met. Millais' son explained that they both posed with wooden props. The soldier "clasped a lay-figure to his breast, while the fair lady leant on the bosom of a man of wood." Millais liked the painting so much that he created a copy which remained in the possession of the family.

The painting was purchased for the highest price Millais had ever received from dealer and publisher Ernest Gambart—one thousand guineas. Gambart sold it on to the well-known Pre-Raphaelite collector Thomas Plint. Plint's art collection, almost exclusively of Pre-Raphaelite art, was sold in 1862 (the year after he died) by Christie's of London. The Black Brunswicker sold for 780 guineas in this sale. Later, in 1898, William Hesketh Lever purchased the work for his private collection.

The painting followed a period of relative lack of success for Millais, and its similarity to A Huguenot is widely interpreted as an attempt to repeat his earlier success. It was engraved in mezzotint by T.L. Atkinson in 1864. Millais also painted two watercolour copies of the composition.

== See also ==
- List of paintings by John Everett Millais
