= The Escape of a Heretic, 1559 =

Painting by John Everett Millais

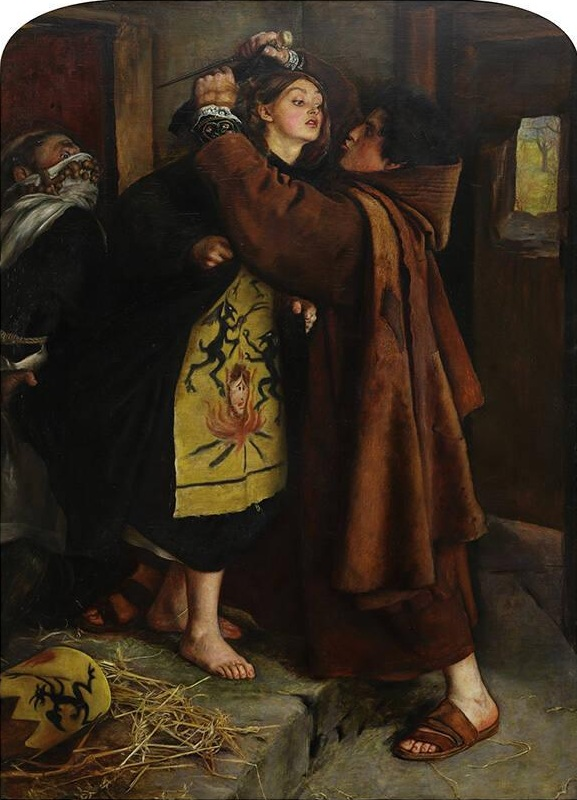
- Artist: John Everett Millais
- Year: 1856–57
- Type: Oil on canvas
- Dimensions: 109.5 cm × 79.1 cm (43.1 in × 31.1 in)
- Location: Museo de Arte de Ponce, Ponce

The Escape of a Heretic, 1559 is an 1856–57 oil painting by the English artist John Everett Millais, depicting a man disguised as a friar rescuing his lover, a heretic woman who has been imprisoned by the Spanish Inquisition. It was displayed in 1898 with a fictional quotation that suggested it was based on a historical event in Valladolid, Spain, in 1584.

== The painting ==
Millais got the idea for the painting when he and his new wife Effie Gray were visiting Mr W. Stirling at Keir in Scotland, in the autumn of 1855. Stirling had a collection of material relating to the Spanish Inquisition, and Millais intended the painting to be a pendant (companion piece) to A Huguenot, on St. Bartholomew's Day, Refusing to Shield Himself from Danger by Wearing the Roman Catholic Badge of 1851–52.

Millais worked on the picture in the winter of 1856 in Perth, Scotland, at the same time he was working on A Dream of the Past: Sir Isumbras at the Ford (1856–57) and in the spring of 1857, when he and Effie had taken rooms in Savile Row, London. In Scotland, Millais used a staircase in Balhousie Castle, Perth, for the painting, while the model for the monk/lover was a young gamekeeper in the service of Mr Condie.

The painting was shown at the Royal Academy Exhibition of 1857, along with two other paintings by Millais.

The painting hung in a special Winter Exhibition at the Royal Academy, London, held between January and March 1898, which featured many collected works of the late Millais (catalogue number 49). At the time it was the property of Sir William Houldsworth, Bart., M. P.. It was displayed at the exhibition with the following text:

"At Valladolid, this Friday before Good Friday, A.D. 1584, before the Licentiate Cristoval Rodriguez, Commissary of the Holy Inquisition, appears Fray Juan Romero, monk of the Order of Saint Dominic, in the convent of the said Order in the said city, familiar of the said Holy Inquisition, and having sworn to speak the truth, saith, - 'That having been assigned together with Fray Diego Runo, familiar of the said Holy Inquisition, as confessor to Maria Juana de Acuiia y Villajos, late in close prison of the said Holy Inquisition, convict, as an obstinate heretic, and left to be delivered to the secular arm at the Act of Faith appointed to be held in the said city, before His Most Catholic Majesty our Lord the King, this day, he was yesterday at noon in the prison of the said prisoner together with a person unknown, whom he supposed to be the said Fray Diego, but saw not his face by reason of his wearing his hood drawn forward, when he was of a sudden set upon, gagged and bound by the said, person unknown, and his habit stripped off and put upon the said prisoner, who so passed out from the said prison with the said person unknown, nor hath since been discovered by the deponent or the other familiars of the said Holy Inquisition in the said city.' — From Documentos relativos á los Procesos por la Inquisicion de Valladolid".

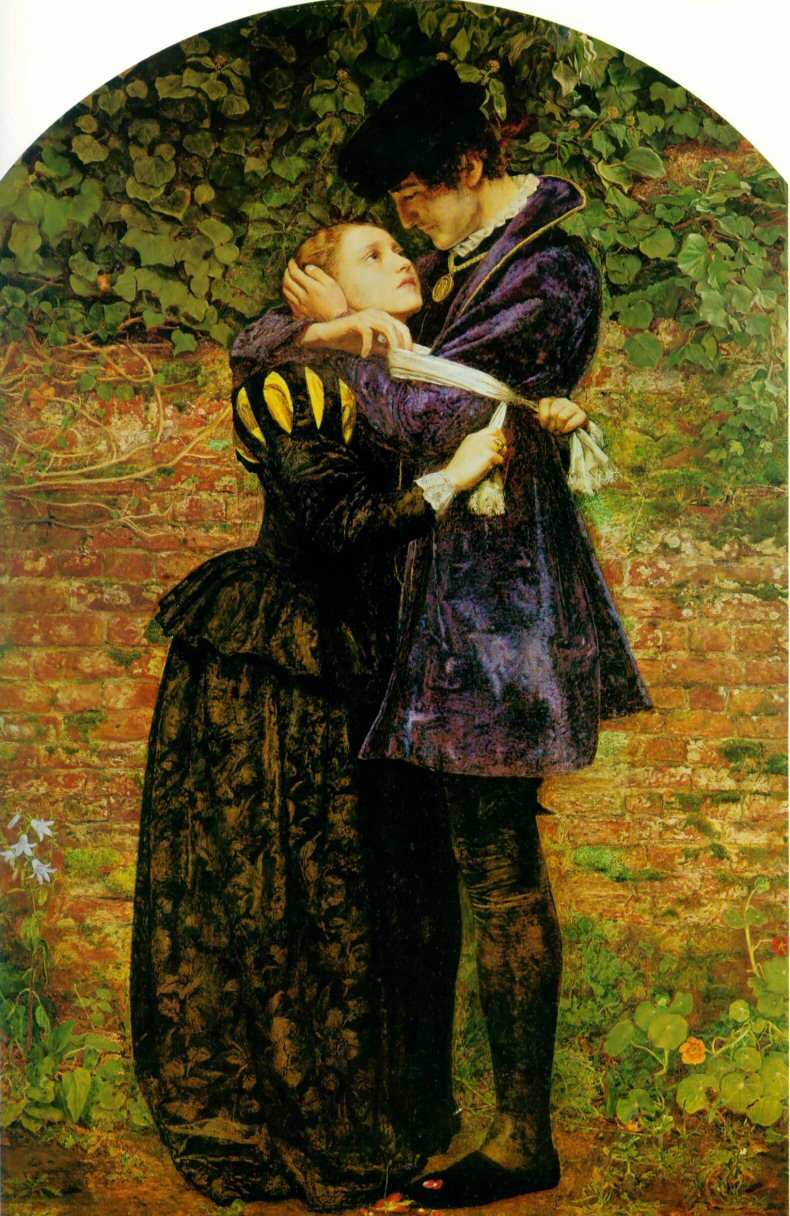
A Huguenot, on St. Bartholomew's Day by Mallais, 1851–52. The Escape of a Heretic, 1559 was painted as a pendant (companion piece) to this painting.

The painting was exhibited in the Nineteenth Century Paintings from the Museo De Arte De Ponce, Puerto Rico, Fundacion Luis A. Ferré exhibition held at the Hayden Gallery at the Massachusetts Institute of Technology in Cambridge, Massachusetts from 17 May to 8 June 1974.

It was exhibited in the Victorian Masterpieces from the Museo de Arte de Ponce, Puerto Rico exhibition at the Metropolitan Museum of Art, New York, from 8 October 2022–4 February 2024.

The painting has been in the collection of the Museo de Arte de Ponce, Ponce since at least 1974, object number 65.0568.

== See also ==
- List of paintings by John Everett Millais
