= Thomas Plint =

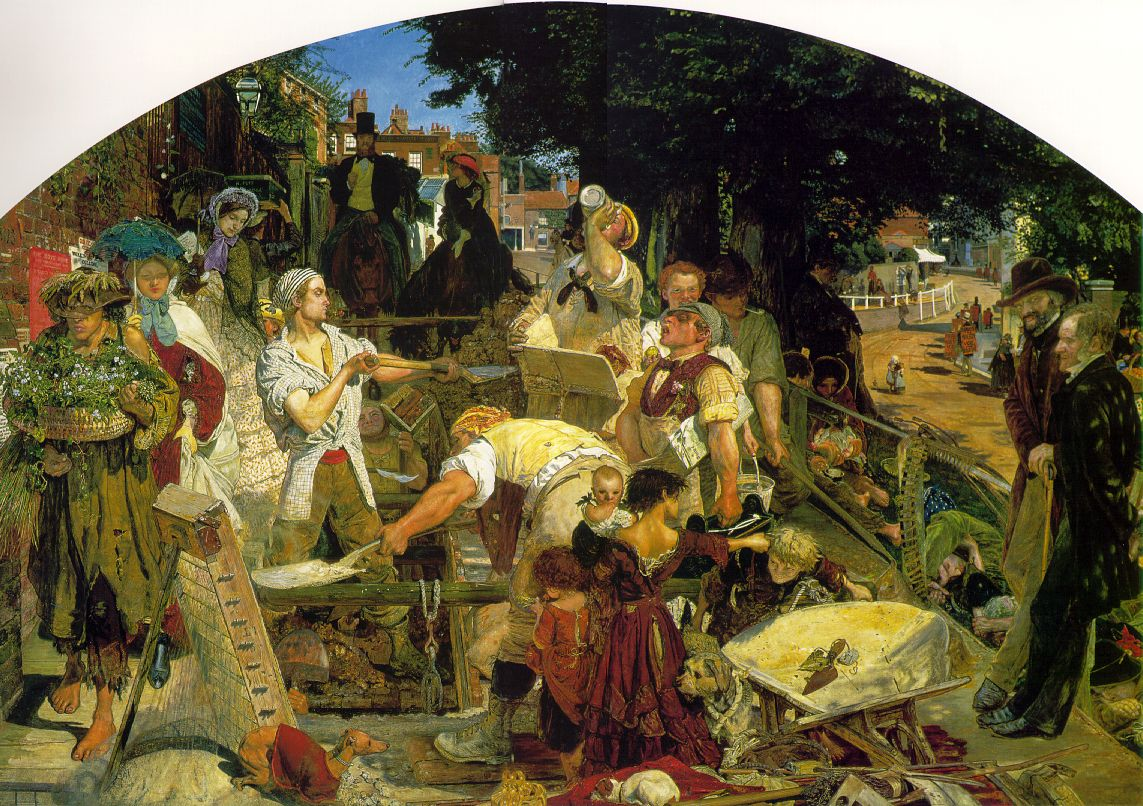
Work by Ford Madox Brown, commissioned by Plint

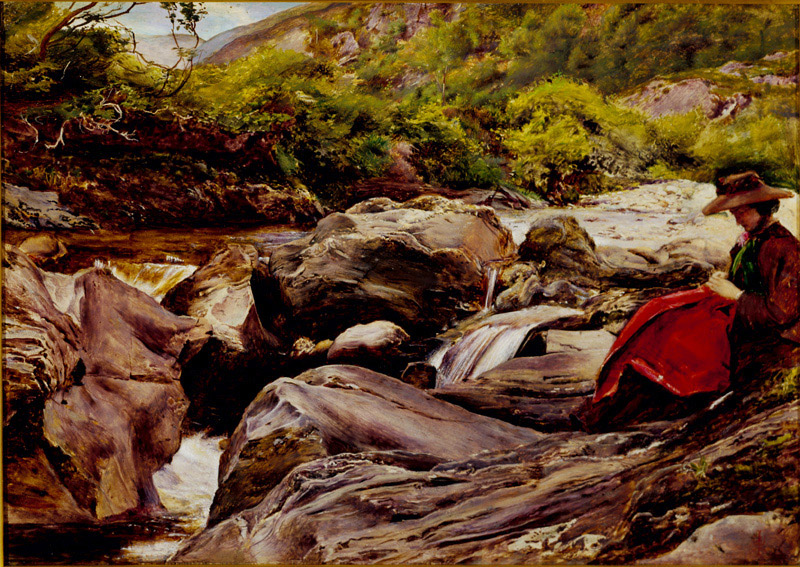
The Waterfall by John Everett Millais, owned by Plint

Thomas Edward Plint (1823–1861) was a British stockbroker and important Pre-Raphaelite art collector who commissioned and owned several notable paintings. In 1839, with his friend Charles Reed, he started and edited a magazine called The Leeds Repository.

A religious evangelical, Plint served as a lay preacher at Leeds Congregational Chapel. In 1852, he commissioned Ford Madox Brown to complete Work, a celebration of the Protestant work ethic. He demanded changes to the composition, notably the inclusion of a distributor of evangelical tracts, but died before its completion.

He was at one time owner of John Everett Millais' The Black Brunswicker, which he purchased from Ernest Gambart. Other paintings in his collection included Millais's Christ in the House of His Parents and The Waterfall.

== Posthumous sale of Plint's art collection ==
Plint's art collection, almost exclusively of Pre-Raphaelite art, was sold in 1862 (the year after he died) by Christie's of London. Works sold included several by Millais: The Wedding Cards (1854, 120 guineas), The Bridesmaid (1851, 120 guineas), The Proscribed Royalist, 1651 (1852–53, 525 guineas), The Carpenter's Shop (also known as Christ in the House of His Parents) (1849–50, 525 guineas), and The Black Brunswicker (1860, 780 guineas).
