= The Waterfall (Millais painting) =

Painting by John Everett Millais

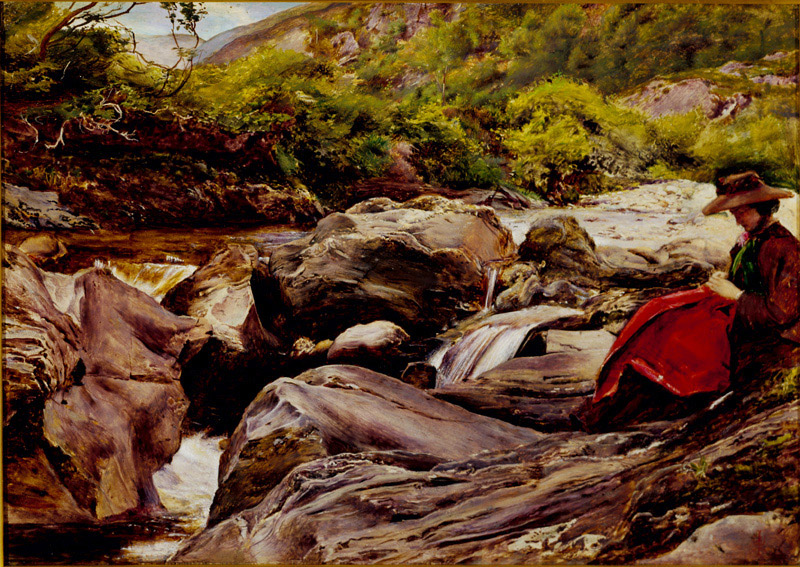
- Artist: John Everett Millais
- Year: 1853
- Type: Oil on panel
- Dimensions: 23.2 cm × 33.3 cm (9.1 in × 13.1 in)
- Location: Delaware Art Museum, Wilmington, Delaware

The Waterfall or A Waterfall at Glenfinlas or Effie at Glenfinlas is an 1853 painting by the English artist John Everett Millais. It shows a woman in a red dress with hat and coat, sitting by a waterfall while sewing.

== The painting ==
The Waterfall was painted in the summer of 1853, when Millais was holidaying in the Scottish Highlands with artist and art critic John Ruskin and Ruskin's wife Euphemia, known as Effie. Millais had travelled to Scotland with his brother William, and they secured lodgings in The New Trossachs Hotel in Callander. The Ruskins rented a house, the Manse, in nearby Brig o' Turk in the Trossachs, and Millais painted en plein air by the river in Glen Finglas (called Glenfinlas by Millais and others).

The Waterfall was a try-out for Millais' portrait of Ruskin, and was finished before work on the latter started. Ruskin wrote to his father on 8 July 1853:

We have been out all day again sitting on the rocks—painting and singing and fishing...Millais...is doing a bit for practice...beautiful thing it will be when done—and mine will be done I hope early next week.

and on 10 July Millais wrote to Mrs Collins, mother of his friend Charles Allston Collins:

Every day that is fine we go to paint at a rocky waterfall and take our dinner with us. Mrs Ruskin brings her work and her husband draws us, nothing could be more delightful...I am painting at present a fall about a mile from this house [in Brig o' Turk] until a canvas shall come whereon I intend to paint a portrait of Ruskin looking into the depths of a waterfall, standing upon a crag.

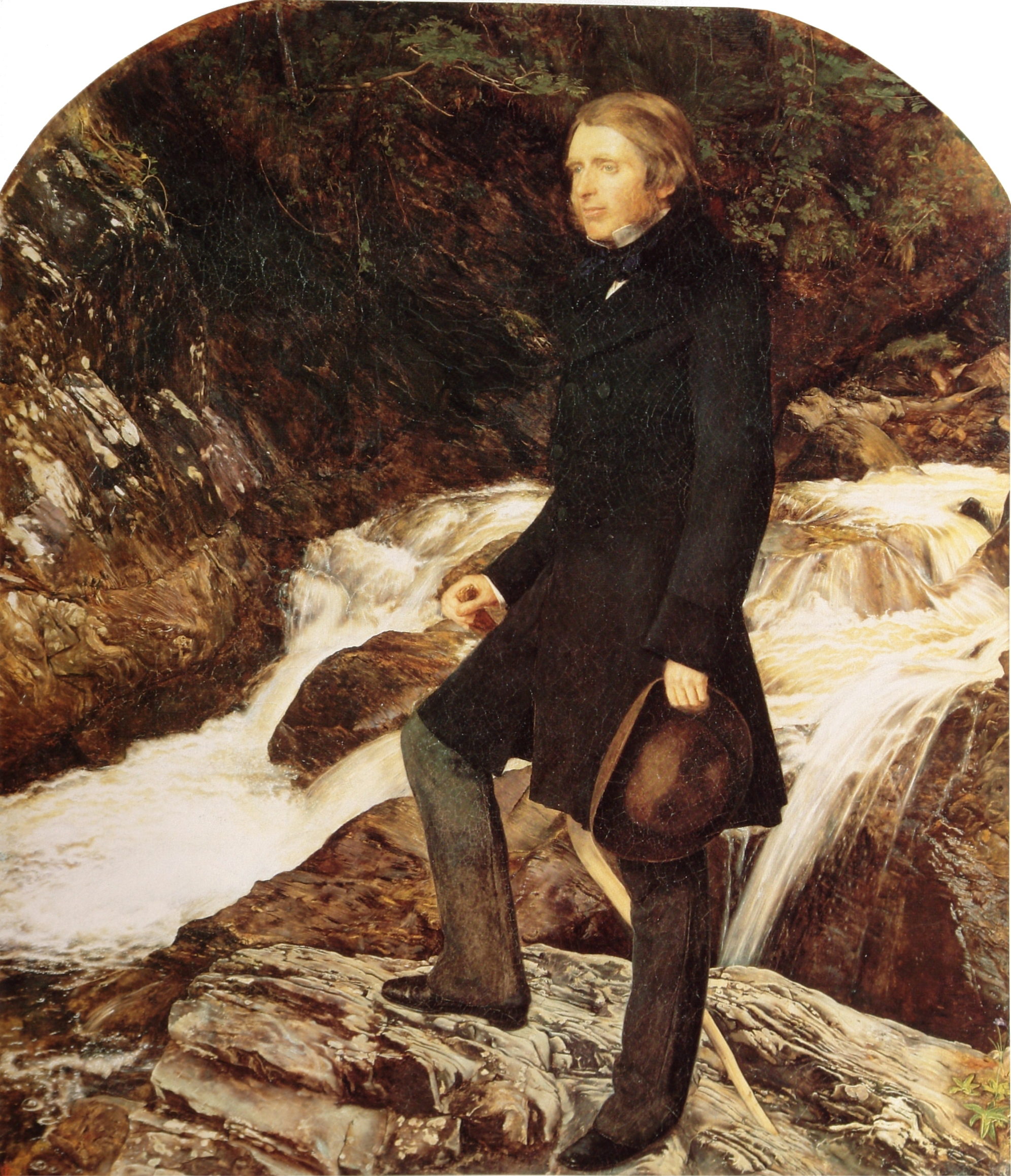
John Ruskin by Millais 1853–54, started just after The Waterfall was completed.

Millais started work on Ruskin's portrait on 28 July, by which time The Waterfall was presumably finished.

At the time, Effie Gray was in an unconsummated marriage with Ruskin, who was nine years her senior. Over the course of the summer Millais painted and sketched her many times, and the young couple fell in love. Effie and Ruskin's marriage was annulled the following year, 1854, at Effie's request. She and Millais married in 1855.

The painting was in the ownership of Benjamin Godfrey Windus by 30 March 1854; it later belonged to Thomas Plint. It joined the collection of Delaware Art Museum, Wilmington, Delaware in 1934, as part of the Samuel and Mary R. Bancroft Memorial.

== See also ==
- List of paintings by John Everett Millais
