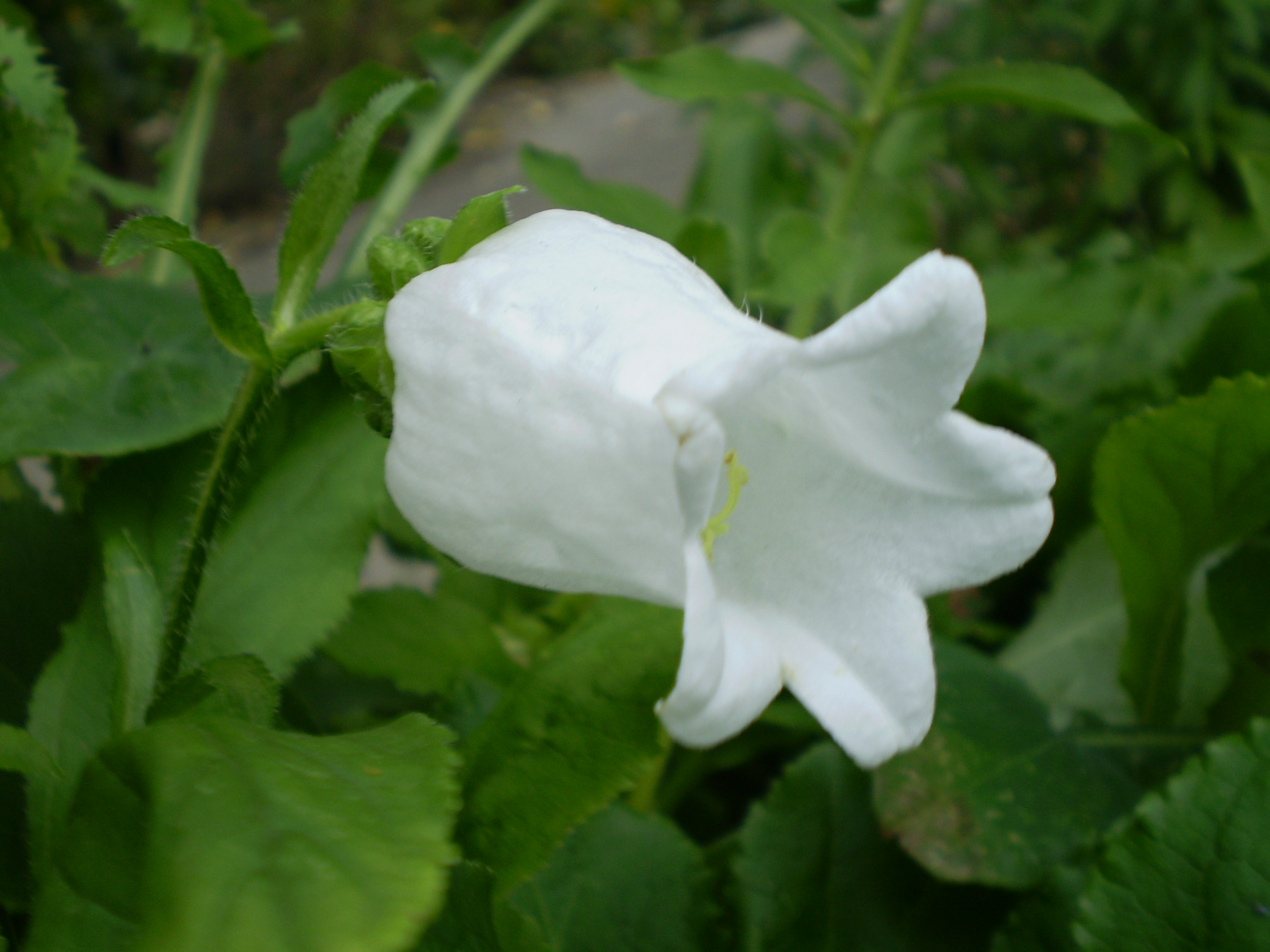
- Flowers and leaves of Campanula medium

Scientific classification
- Kingdom: Plantae
- Clade: Tracheophytes
- Clade: Angiosperms
- Clade: Eudicots
- Clade: Asterids
- Order: Asterales
- Family: Campanulaceae
- Genus: Campanula
- Species: C. medium

Binomial name
- Campanula medium L.

= Campanula medium =

Species of flowering plant

Campanula medium, common name Canterbury bells, is an annual or biennial flowering plant of the genus Campanula, belonging to the family Campanulaceae. In floriography, it represents gratitude, or faith and constancy. It is the national flower of Monaco

== Name and Origin ==
The plant's common name originates from its resemblance to the bells of Canterbury Cathedral and the bells worn by pilgrims although some sources claim they were originally called Coventry bells. The plant was brought into the UK in the 16th century while other sources state the plant arrived in the 19th century.

== Etymology ==
The specific epithet medium means that this plant has intermediate characteristics in respect of other species of the genus Campanula. In Persian, it is called گل استکانی (gol-e estekani) meaning "glass flower", because the flower resembles a drinking glass.

== Description ==
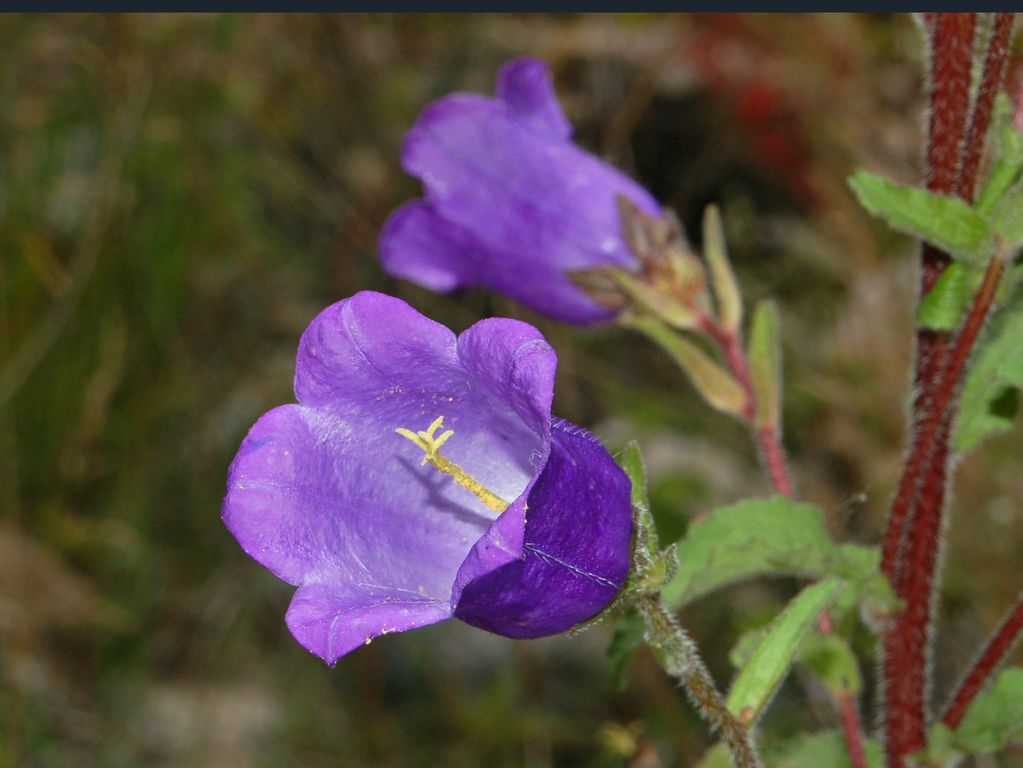
Close-up on a flower of Campanula medium

Campanula medium reaches approximately 60–80 cm (24–31 in) in height. This biennial herbaceous plant forms rosettes of leaves in the first year, stems and flowers in the second one. The stem is erect, robust, reddish-brown and bristly hairy. The basal leaves are stalked and lanceolate to elliptical and 12–15 cm (5–6 in) long with serrated leaf edge. The upper leaves are smaller, lanceolate and sessile, almost embracing the stem.

The flowers are arranged in a racemose inflorescence of extremely long-lasting blooms. These attractive bell-shaped flowers are short-stalked, large and hermaphroditic, with different shades of violet-blue or rarely white. The corolla has five fused petals with lightly bent lobes (known as a coronate flower type).

The flowering period extends from May to July in the Northern Hemisphere. The flowers are either self-fertilized (autogamy) or pollinated by insects such as bees and butterflies (entomogamy). The seeds ripen from August to September and are dispersed by gravity alone (barochory).

== Distribution ==
Campanula medium originates in southern Europe. It is naturalized in most of European countries and in North America and it is widely cultivated for its beautiful flowers.

== Habitat ==
It grows on stony, rocky and bushy slopes, at an altitude of 0–1,500 metres (0–4,921 ft) above sea level.

== Gardening ==
In gardens, they are best in massed planting in borders or among shrubs. It prefers cool or warm zones; not suitable for the tropics or hot, dry regions. Seeds take 14–21 days to germinate. The plant thrives in lightly shaded to sunny locations in well-drained soil. Canterbury bells grows nicely in flower beds, borders, and containers. Keep well watered.

== Uses ==
This flower works well cut in floral arrangements. Beekeepers sometimes use the Canterbury Bell for making potently sweet honey.

== Gallery ==
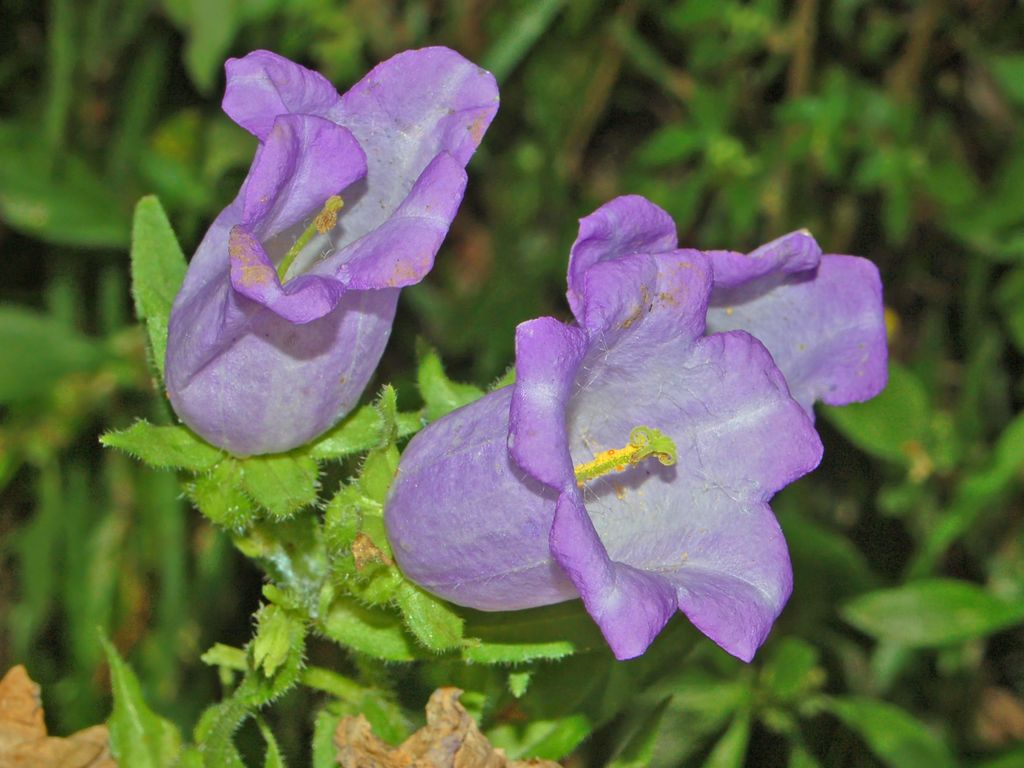
Flowers of Campanula medium

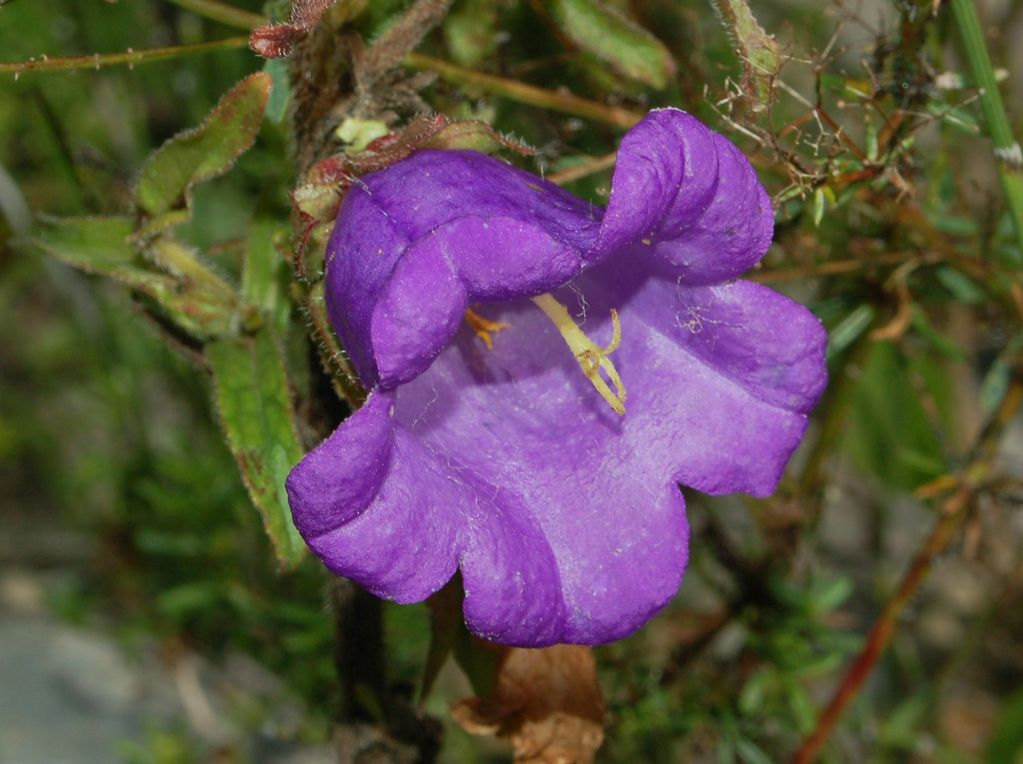
Close up of a flower of Campanula medium

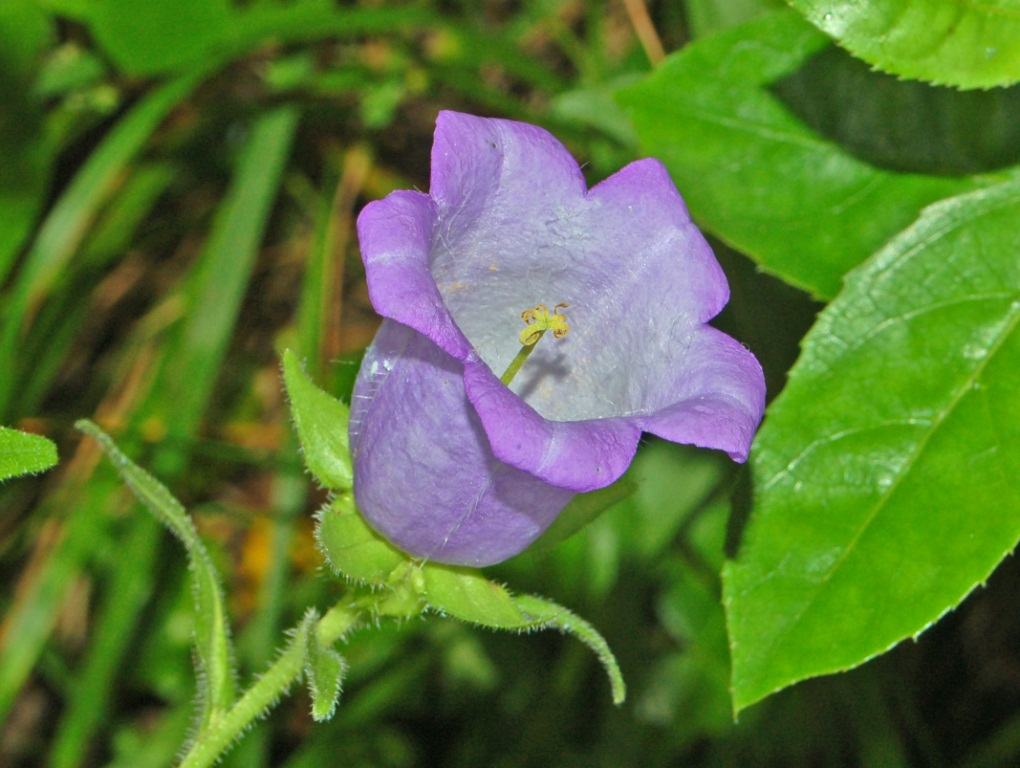
Close up of a flowers of Campanula medium

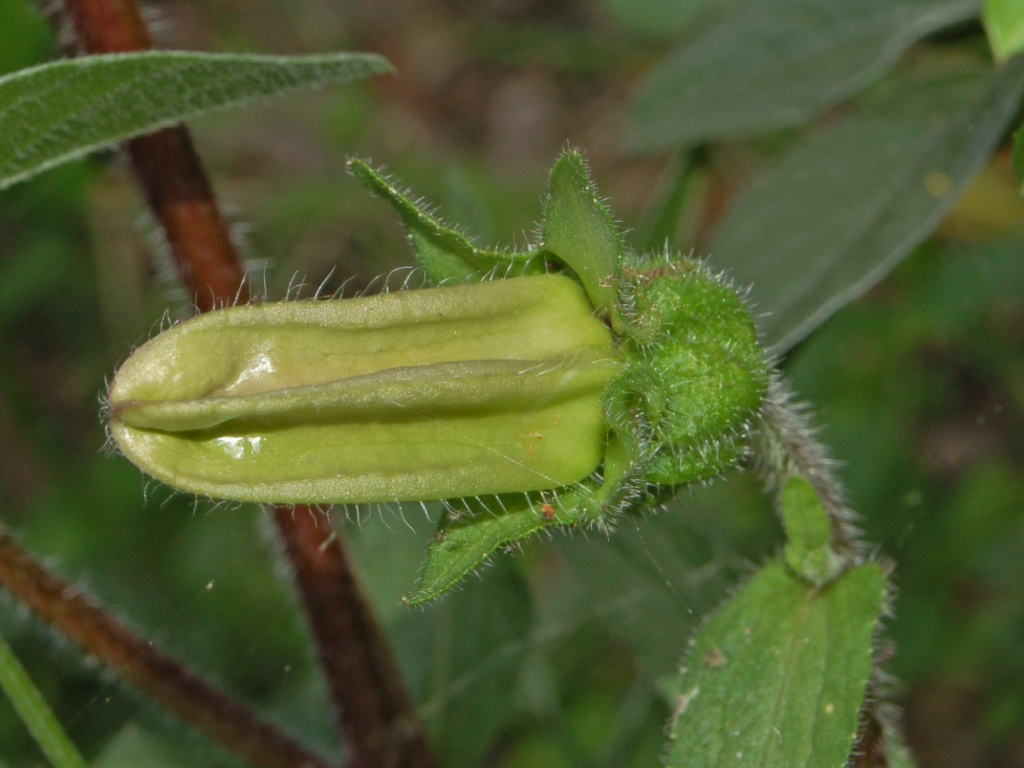
Blossom of Campanula medium

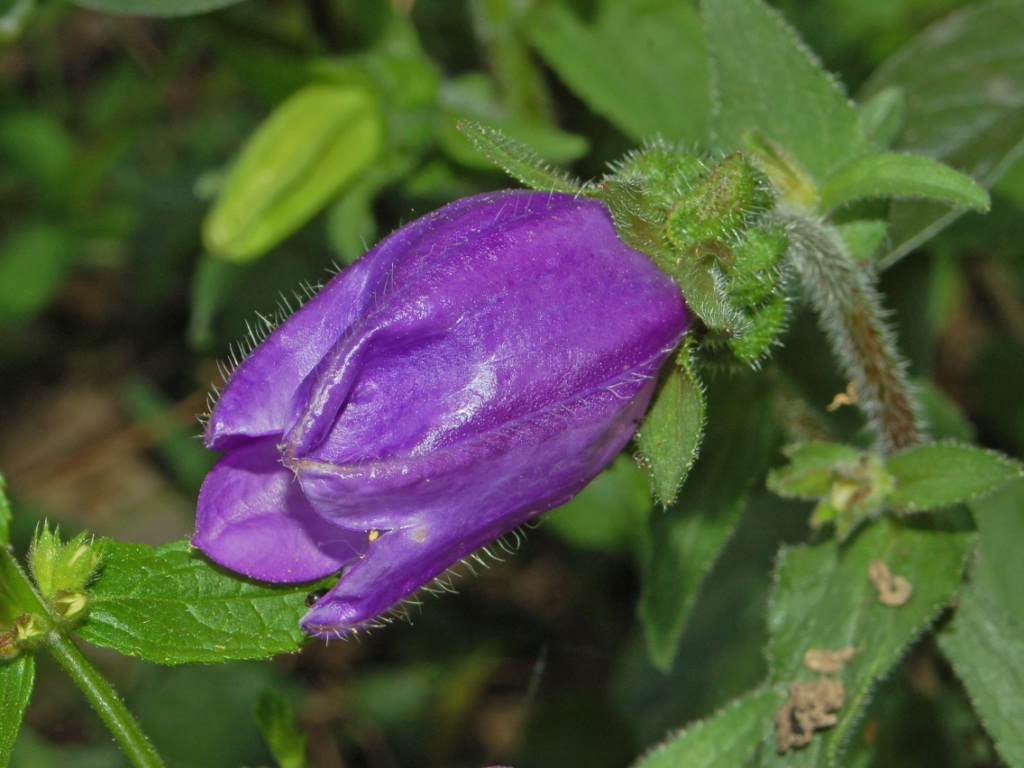
Blossom of Campanula medium

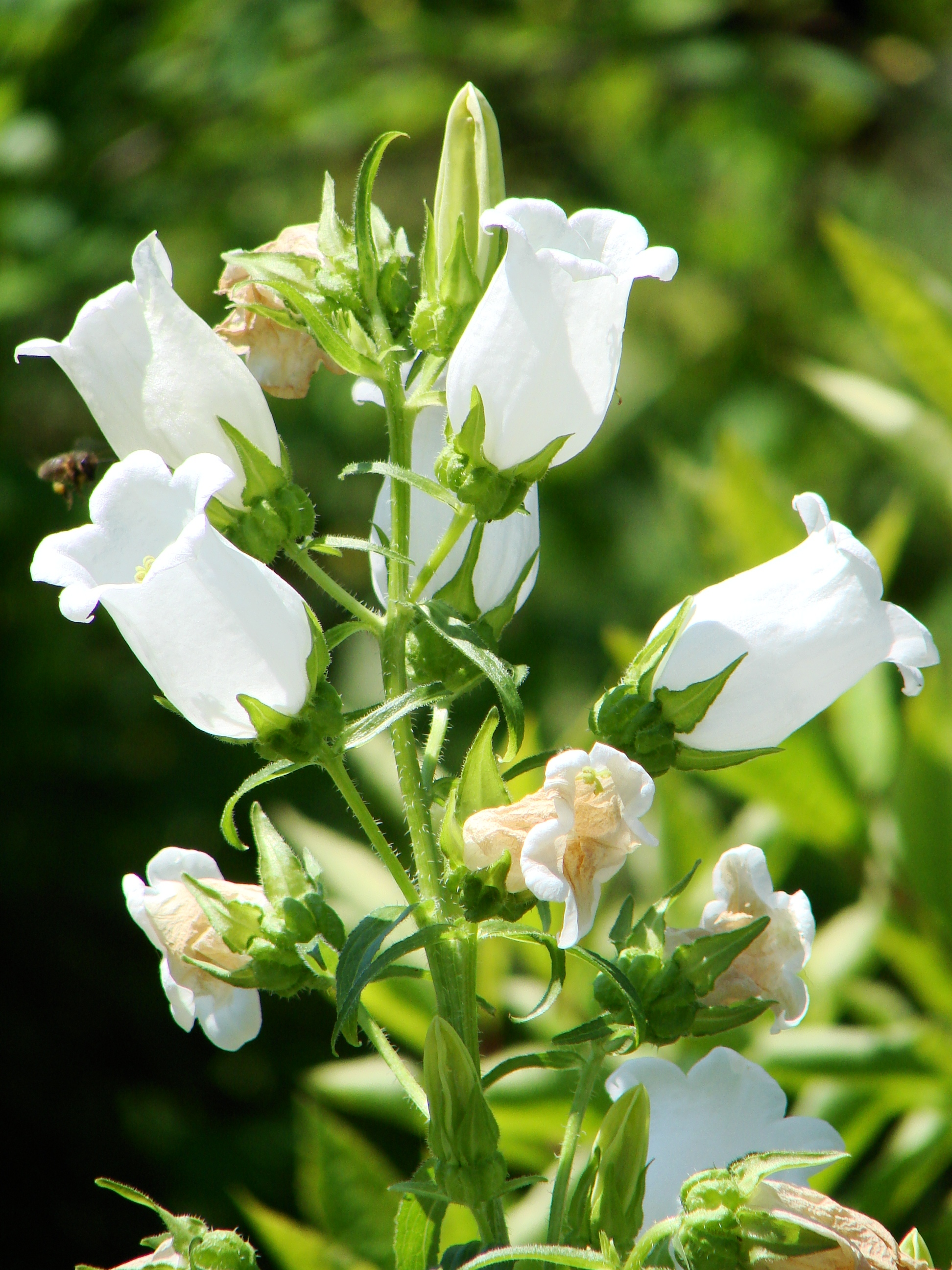
Campanula medium var. alba

== Cultivars ==
- Campanula medium 'Alba'
- Campanula medium 'Bells of Holland'
- Campanula medium 'Caerulea'
- Campanula medium 'Calycanthema'
- Campanula medium 'Champion Blue (dark flowers)
- Campanula medium 'Champion lavender' (light purple flowers)
- Campanula medium 'Champion Pink' (pink flowers)
- Campanula medium 'Chelsea Pink' (pink flowers)
- Campanula medium 'Muse Rose'
- Campanula medium 'Rosea'
- Campanula medium 'Russian Pink'
