= Spencer-Stanhope family =

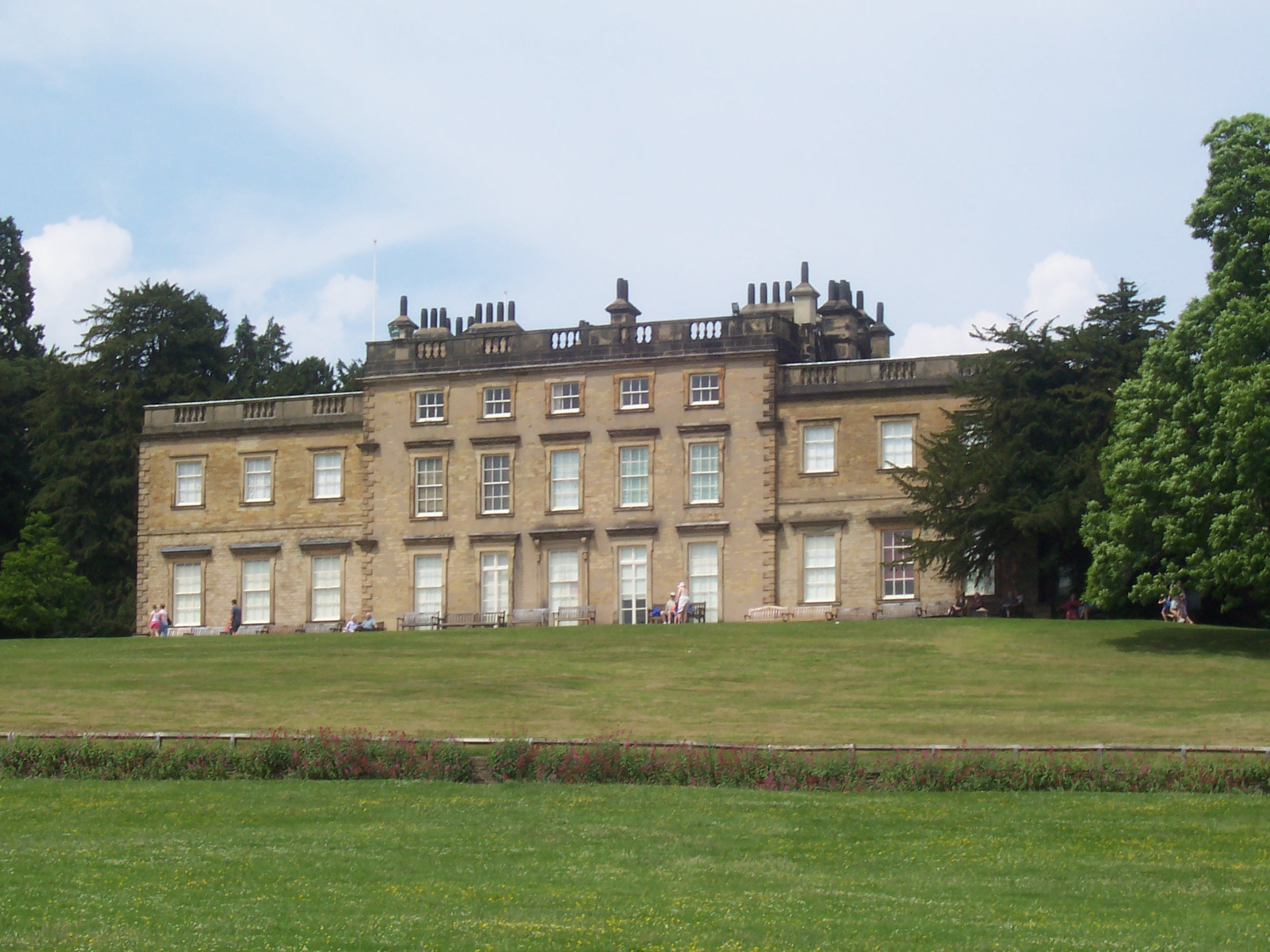
Cannon Hall, home of the Spencer-Stanhope family for 200 years

Spencer-Stanhope is the family name of British landed gentry who for 200 years held Cannon Hall, a country house in South Yorkshire that since the 1950s has been a museum. The hyphenated form of the name is more common in British orthography, but American sources often omit the hyphen and alphabetize by "Stanhope."

== 19th century ==
Throughout the 19th and early 20th century, several family members (by birth and marriage) were active in the art world. They were related through John Spencer Stanhope (1787–1873), a classical antiquarian, writer, and explorer, and his wife, Lady Elizabeth, daughter of Thomas Coke of Norfolk, 1st Earl of Leicester. John Spencer Stanhope was the son of industrialist Walter Spencer-Stanhope (1749–1822). The couple died in 1873 within a few days of each other; she on 31 October, he on 7 November. They had six children:

- Sir Walter Spencer-Stanhope (1827–1911), Conservative politician. He married Elizabeth Buxton and had 11 children including:
  - Gertrude Spencer-Stanhope, a Pre-Raphaelite painter and sculptor, including of church works.
  - Cecily Spencer-Stanhope, helped her father to create the Fairylands part of the grounds of Cannon Hall.
- John Roddam Spencer-Stanhope (1829–1908), a noted second-generation Pre-Raphaelite artist.
- Anna Maria Wilhelmina married Percival André Pickering, Queen's Counsel, Recorder of Pontefract. They had five children, including:
  - Evelyn, the Pre-Raphaelite artist known by her married surname, Evelyn De Morgan, whose husband was the artist William De Morgan.
  - Percival Spencer Umfreville Pickering, a chemist and horticulturist, known for Pickering emulsion.
  - Anna Maria Diana Wilhelmina, author of several books writing as A. M. W. Stirling under her married surname, and founder of the De Morgan Centre for the Study of 19th Century Art and Society.
- Eliza Anne (d. 1859), who married the Rev. Richard St. John Tyrwhitt of Oxford.
- Anne Alicia.
- Louisa Elizabeth (1832–1867).

== See also ==
- Cannon Hall
- John Roddam Spencer-Stanhope
- Evelyn De Morgan

== Sources ==
- Burke, Bernard. A Genealogical and Heraldic Dictionary of the Landed Gentry of Great Britain and Ireland. London 1863. Part 2, 4th edition, p. 1417.
- The De Morgan Centre for the Study of 19th Century Art and Society, home
- Pratt, Charles Tiplady. A History of Cawthorne. Barnsley 1882. Online and also here on Wikisource.
- Stirling, A.M.W. Coke of Norfolk and His Friends. New York 1908, vol. 2
