= Love and the Maiden =

1877 painting by John Roddam Spencer Stanhop

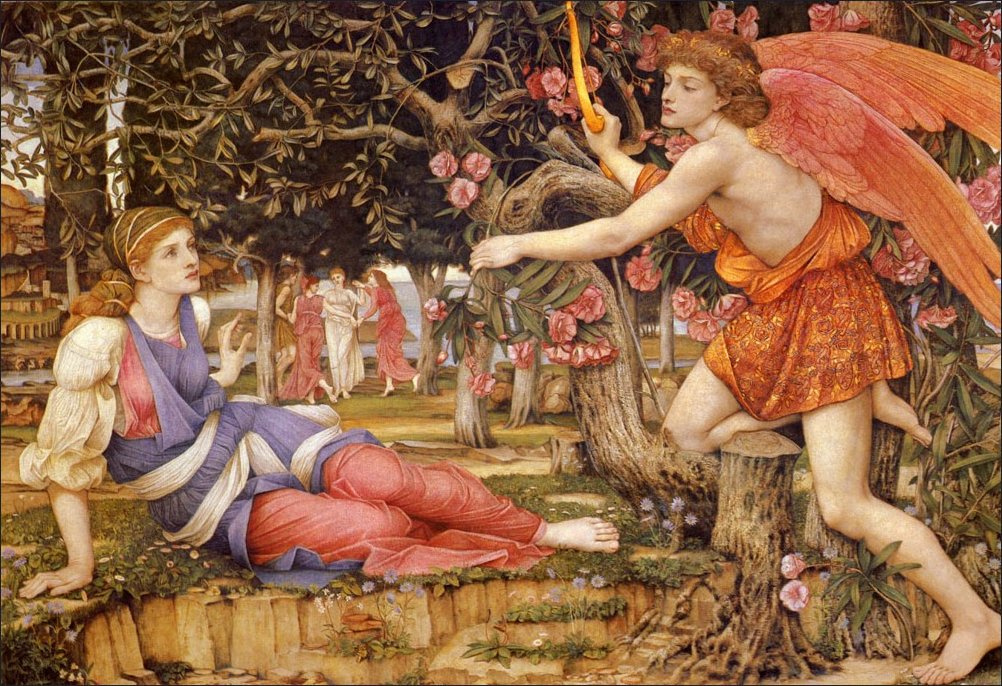
- Artist: John Roddam Spencer Stanhope
- Year: 1877
- Type: Oil, gold paint and gold leaf on canvas
- Dimensions: 86.4 cm × 50.8 cm (34.0 in × 20.0 in)
- Location: Fine Arts Museums of San Francisco, San Francisco, CA

Love and the Maiden is an 1877 oil painting (previously mistaken for tempera) on canvas, by English Pre-Raphaelite artist John Roddam Spencer Stanhope, that is now in the Fine Arts Museums of San Francisco.

== History ==
Known as one of the "second-generation" of Pre-Raphaelites, Stanhope was among Dante Gabriel Rossetti's mural-painting party at the Oxford Union in 1857, together with Arthur Hughes, John Hungerford Pollen, Valentine Prinsep, Edward Burne-Jones and William Morris. He was a founder member of the Hogarth Club, a direct descendant of the Pre-Raphaelite Brotherhood.

This painting is considered one of Stanhope's best, and represents two radically different artistic phases of his life. Although he began as fervently Pre-Raphaelite in outlook, Stanhope was deeply attracted by the Aesthetic movement during the 1860s. Love and the Maiden is a succinct mingling of these two equally formative phases in his career. Its presence in the 1877 exhibition at the Grosvenor Gallery — Aestheticism's most famous exposé — demonstrates his adherence to the latter movement, whereas the painting's similarity to the work of Edward Burne-Jones and Dante Gabriel Rossetti — the group of dancing women in the background are similar to those portrayed by Rossetti in The Bower Meadow (1871–72) — betray Stanhope's Pre-Raphaelite background.

During his time in Oxford in 1857, Stanhope wrote that he spent most days painting with Burne-Jones; possibly as a result of this, a great deal of Burne-Jones' influence can be seen in his work — although it could be argued that Burne-Jones also drew ideas from Stanhope's work. The androgynous physiques, Grecian-style draperies and facial expressions depicted in Love and the Maiden are classic Burne-Jones hallmarks, even though the facial similarities probably also arose from use of the same models.

== See also ==
- English art
- List of Pre-Raphaelite paintings
