= Cannon Hall Farm =

Farm in South Yorkshire, England

Coordinates: 53.5719°N 1.5903°W

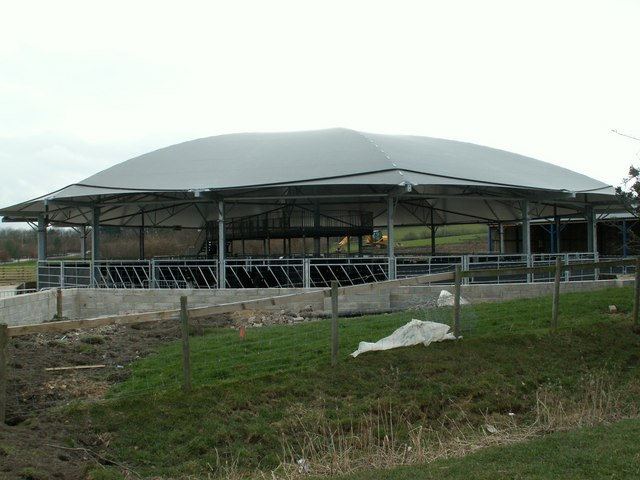
Roundhouse-type cattle house

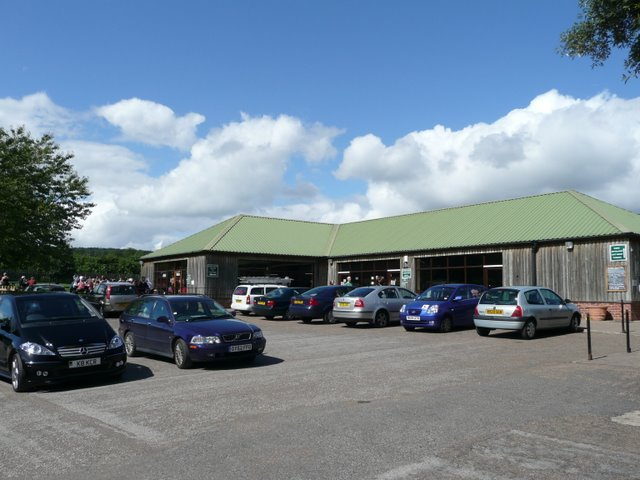
The restaurant

Cannon Hall Farm is a working farm, tourist attraction and zoo close to the village of Cawthorne, near Barnsley in the English county of South Yorkshire. Open to visitors since 1989, it is owned and run by the Nicholson family. The farm was voted Best Tourist Experience at the Welcome to Yorkshire White Rose Awards 2011. Cannon Hall Farm was once the home farm for Cannon Hall, built by the Spencer-Stanhope family and now a museum. Roger Nicholson, who developed the current farm and attractions inherited the land when he was 16. The farm itself raises sheep, goats, and pigs, with over 750 lambs reared, and 400 ewes and 800 piglets produced annually. The site's visitor attractions include an adventure playground, large tube maze, farm shop, delicatessen, extensive nocturnal house, reptile house, gift and toy shop, and restaurants.

== History ==
The oldest reference of the farm was made in a conveyance dated 1650 when William Hewet sold the Manor and Farm to Robert Hartley. It was then sold to John Spencer and the Spencer family owned the Cannon Hall until 1775. For centuries, it served as the home farm to the Cannon Hall Estate and was known for its fine strain of pedigree Large White pigs. The estate was broken up and sold to Charles Nicholson in 1957 and is currently owned by his son, Roger Nicholson.

== Rob and Dave Nicholson: television career ==
On 17 February 2017, the Nicholsons were seen on The Farmers' Country Showdown, a BBC One programme which usually follows food producers and farmers at a number of country shows and local markets. The episode in which Cannon Hall Farm appeared was of a slightly different format to the rest of the series, as it followed the Nicholsons as they competed against two other farming families (Richard and Anna May of Springfield Farm in Devon and the Richards in Cornwall) in the run up to the Diversification of the Year Award being presented at the Farmers Weekly Awards.

In 2018, Cannon Hall Farm was featured on a television programme called Springtime on the Farm, which was broadcast on Channel 5, from 9 April 2018 to 13 April 2018, and which was recommissioned as the weekly show This Week on the Farm in 2020. The most recent episode of the series was broadcast as part of a live seasonal version called Winter on the Farm on 9 December 2021 with guests Reuben Owen (from Our Yorkshire Farm) and Shona Searson (from The Yorkshire Vet) joining presenters Helen Skelton and Jules Hudson on the farm with Rob and Dave Nicholson.

In June 2020, it was announced that Cannon Hall Farm had received the Commonwealth Points of Light Award (awarded by Her Majesty The Queen, the prime minister, Boris Johnson, the British Government and Commonwealth nations), for its daily live broadcast on social media during Coronavirus lockdown.

In July 2021, Princess Anne visited Cannon Hall Farm to formally open the farm's new dog friendly café, "Lucky Pup", footage of which was shown not only on Channel 5's This Week on the Farm, but on The Yorkshire Vet as well, with the vet Matt Smith meeting the Princess as he tended to an injured goat.

On 27 January 2022, the Nicholsons followed the journalist Christa Ackroyd and The Yorkshire Vet's Peter Wright and Julian Norton as presenters on Channel 5's documentary series Our Great Yorkshire Life, which showed them investigating fishing off the coast of Whitby.

In August 2022, Daisybeck Studios teamed the brothers up with historian Ruth Goodman for a version of her Victorian Farm programme called A Farm Through Time. Unlike Victorian Farm, this three-part history programme also investigates the farming industry in the Iron Age and during the Second World War, with the World War episode bring filmed at Tatton Park, as well as Cannon Hall Farm. Marianka Swain of The Daily Telegraph gave the first episode three stars out of five in a review that thought that Rob and Dave, "the Ant and Dec of agriculture", may have been teetering on "the edge of parody" at times with this genial Channel 5 show.

In February 2024, Channel 5 launched Cannon Hall: A Yorkshire Farm, a new spin-off to the all the live ...on the Farm programmes. Again this programme will feature Rob and Dave alongside their father Roger Nicholson, The Yorkshire Vets, Helen Skelton, JB Gill and Adam Henson, with Jules Hudson being the main presenter/narrator of the series.

== 5 on The Farm ==
5 on The Farm is Channel 5's festival which first took place at Cannon Hall Farm on August Bank Holiday Weekend in 2021. The three-day event featured the presenters from Channel 5's ...on the Farm series (including Adam Henson, Helen Skelton, Jules Hudson and JB Gill) along with Peter Wright and Julian Norton from The Yorkshire Vet, Reuben and Amanda Owen from Our Yorkshire Farm, Ben Fogle from New Lives in the Wild, Graeme Hall from Dogs Behaving (Very) Badly, Stefan Gates from Secrets of your Supermarket Food, chef Tim Bilton and Milkshake! presenters Derek Moran, Jen Pringle and Kemi Majeks. For children there were characters from Milkshake! including Peppa Pig, Milkshake! Monkey and Fireman Sam.

== See also ==
- Listed buildings in Cawthorne
