= John Spencer Stanhope =

English landowner and antiquarian

John Spencer Stanhope (1787–1873) was an English landowner and antiquarian.

== Life ==
The son of Walter Spencer-Stanhope, he was born 27 May 1787. He matriculated at Christ Church, Oxford in 1804. Around 1807 he was in Edinburgh, and joined the Speculative Society.

Spencer Stanhope, after travel, spent the years 1810 to 1813 as a French prisoner of war of the French, taken captive by bad faith. He was detained for two years in Verdun, allowed to visit Paris, and then set free. He travelled with Thomas Allason in Greece. Based on researches carried out there, he published Topography illustrative of the Battle of Plataea in 1817. In 1816 he had added to the Elgin Marbles in the British Museum a piece of Parthenon frieze he had purchased in Greece.

With an estate also at Horsforth, Spencer Stanhope resided at Cannon Hall, in Yorkshire. He died on 8 November 1873. He was a Fellow of the Royal Society (FRS) and Society of Antiquaries of London.

== Family ==
Stanhope married in 1822 Elizabeth Wilhelmina Coke, daughter of Thomas William Coke, 1st Earl of Leicester. Walter Spencer-Stanhope (1827–1911) and John Roddam Spencer Stanhope were their sons. Of four daughters,

- Anna Wilhelmina married the lawyer Percival Pickering, and was mother of the Pre-Raphaelite painter Evelyn De Morgan, chemist and horticulturist Percival Spencer Umfreville Pickering, FRS; Rowland Neville Umfreville (1861–1931) and writer A. M. W. Stirling.
- Eliza Anne married Richard St John Tyrwhitt.

Anne Alicia and Louisa Elizabeth were unmarried.
