= Edward Pickering =

Edward Pickering may refer to:

- Edward Charles Pickering (1846–1919), American astronomer
- Edward Pickering (journalist) (1912–2003), British newspaper editor
- Ted Pickering (born 1939), Australian politician
- Edward Pickering (cricketer) (1807–1852), English cricketer
