= Gertrude Spencer-Stanhope =

English sculptor and painter

Gertrude Spencer-Stanhope (1857–1944) was an English sculptor and painter. She was the niece of John Roddam Spencer-Stanhope and the cousin of Evelyn Pickering De Morgan, both of whom were noted pre-Raphaelite painters.

== Life and career ==
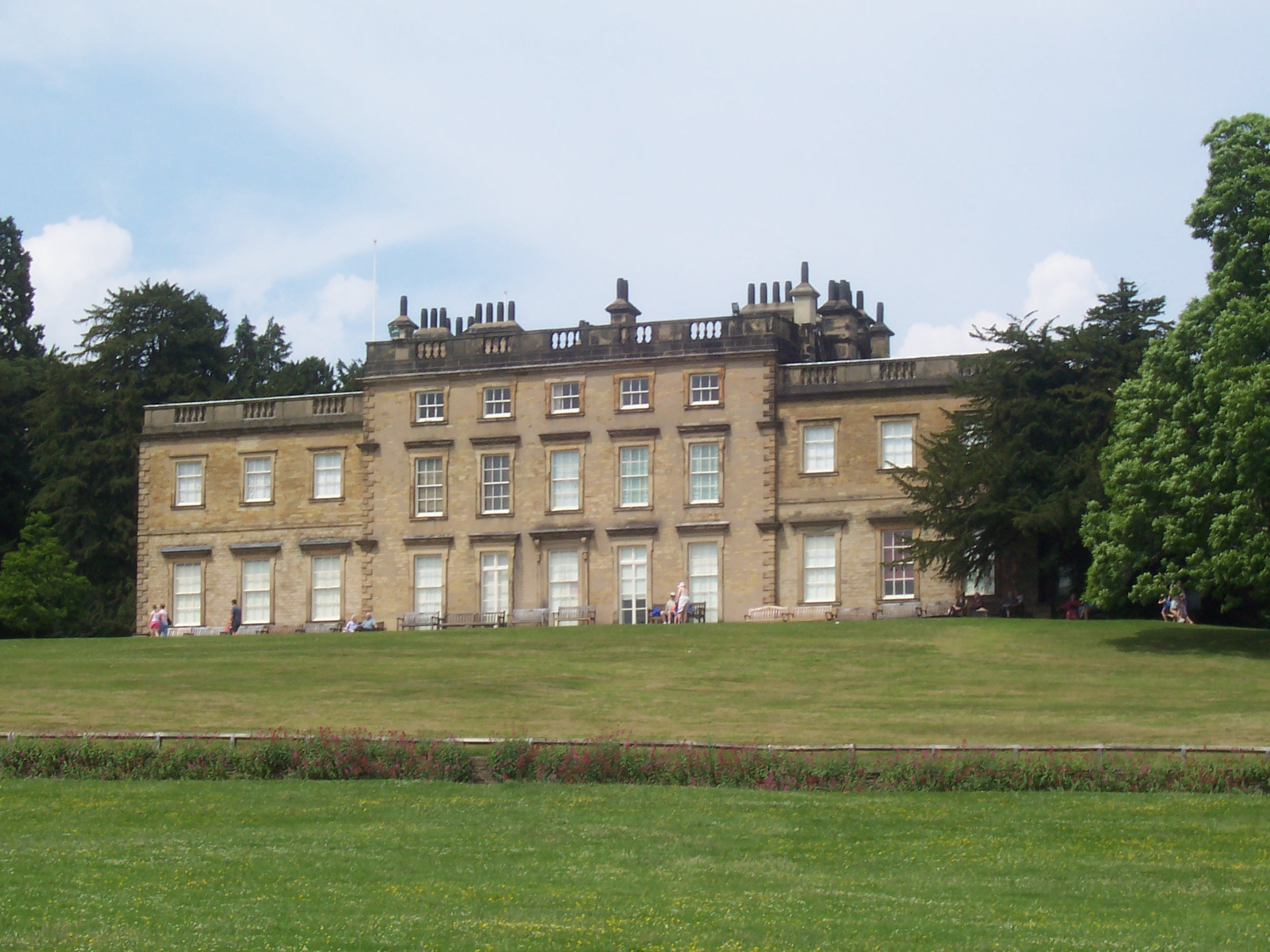
Cannon Hall, home of Gertrude Spencer-Stanhope and now a museum

Mary Gertrude Elizabeth Spencer-Stanhope was the eldest of 11 children. Her mother was born Elizabeth Julia Buxton, the daughter of Sir John Jacob Buxton. Her father was Sir Walter Spencer Stanhope, who owned Cannon Hall in Barnsley from 1873 to 1911.

The Cannon Hall estate had been in possession of the Spencer family, and, later, the Spencer-Stanhopes, since 1660. In 1951, the last surviving member of the family sold the house to the Barnsley Council. It was opened to the public as a museum in 1957. As part of its 50th anniversary celebration in 2007, Cannon Hall Museum featured 19th-century artists from the Spencer-Stanhope family in the exhibition Painters of Dreams. Bronze sculptures by Gertrude Spencer-Stanhope were exhibited, along with paintings by John Roddam Spencer-Stanhope and Evelyn De Morgan, and ceramics by William De Morgan, Evelyn's husband. Also highlighted were the ballroom at Cannon Hall and "Fairyland" in the pleasure grounds, which had been designed by Sir Walter and Gertrude's sister Cecily. Painters of Dreams ran from 23 May to 9 September 2007.

== Works ==
Left panel (detail) of the pulpit in Christ Church, Isle of Dogs

Gertrude Spencer-Stanhope exhibited paintings during the period 1886–1909 at both regional and London galleries, but these works are not now well-known.

She produced perhaps only three bronze sculptures. In early 2006, the bronzes entered public ownership as part of the Museums, Libraries and Archives Council's Acceptance in Lieu programme, which allows art and heritage objects to satisfy inheritance tax in the UK. The three — a female nude, a Pan (on view online and archived), and a lyre-playing Orpheus — were allocated to Barnsley Metropolitan Borough Council for display at Cannon Hall Museum. The works are regarded as "fine examples of the small-scale domestic bronze that was popular in late 19th century Britain" and are notable also because women rarely had the opportunity to work as sculptors at the time.

Spencer-Stanhope is also thought to have been the artist who painted the panels for the pulpit in Christ Church, Isle of Dogs. The work shows the influence of her uncle's pulpit panels in St. James the Great Church, Flockton, Wakefield; two panels appear to be imitations, with the third taking a more definably original approach. (The painted mural over the chancel arch is tentatively credited to John Roddam.) Gertrude had given the pulpit, installed in 1907, in memory of her brother Edward, but the particular connection of the Spencer-Stanhope family to Christ Church is unknown.
