= Thoughts of the Past =

Painting by John Roddam Spencer Stanhope

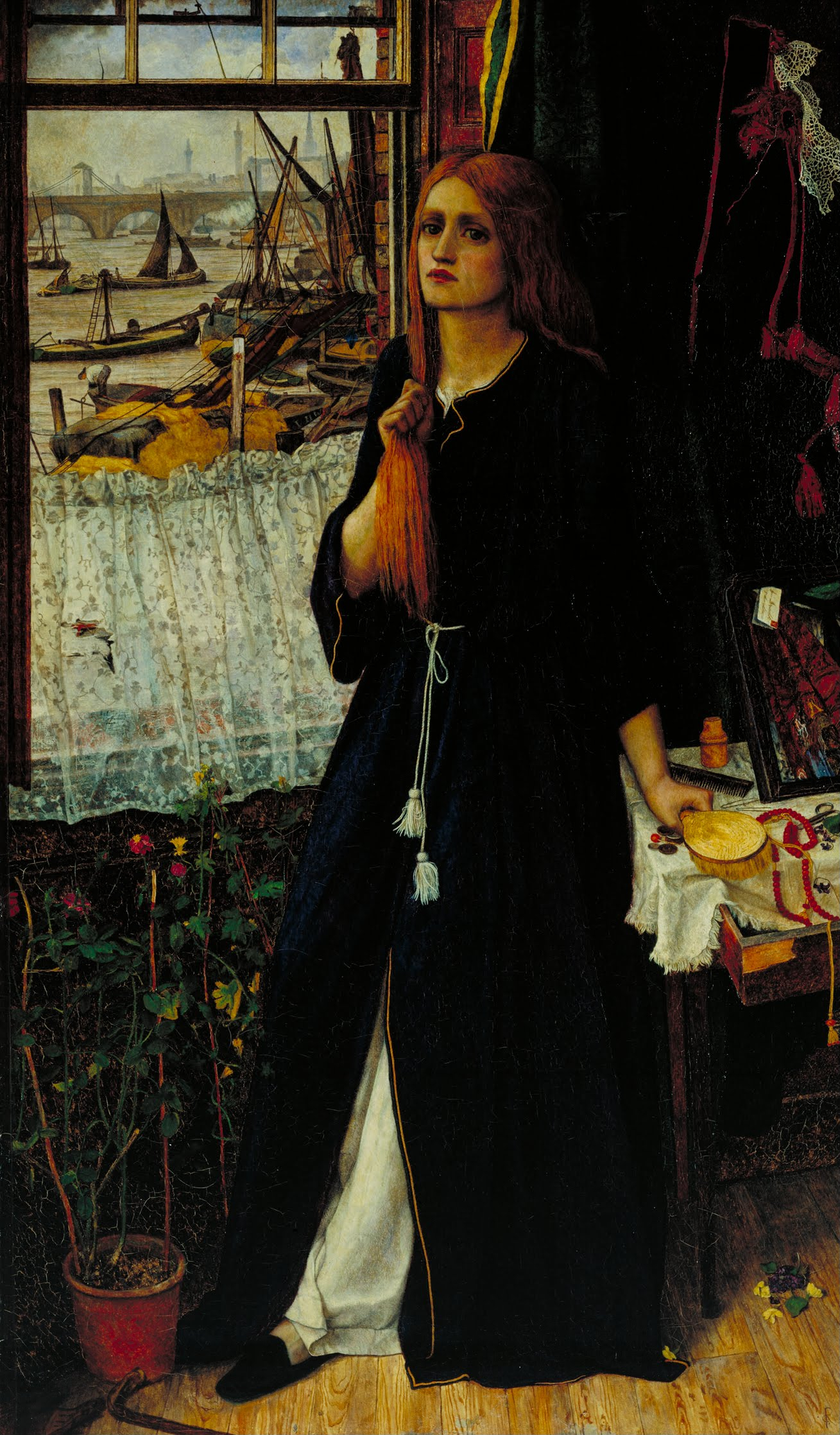
- Artist: John Roddam Spencer Stanhope
- Year: Exhibited in 1859
- Medium: oil on canvas
- Dimensions: 86.4 cm × 50.8 cm (34.0 in × 20.0 in)
- Location: Tate Britain; London

Thoughts of the Past is an oil painting on canvas by English Pre-Raphaelite artist John Roddam Spencer Stanhope, first exhibited in 1859 and currently housed at Tate Britain.

== History ==
Known as one of the "second-generation" of Pre-Raphaelites, Stanhope was among Dante Gabriel Rossetti's mural-painting party at the Oxford Union in 1857, together with Arthur Hughes, John Hungerford Pollen, Valentine Prinsep, Ned Burne-Jones and William Morris (nicknamed Topsy). He was a founder member of the Hogarth Club, a direct descendant of the Pre-Raphaelite Brotherhood.

This painting, with his depiction of a prostitute remorsefully contemplating her life, showed a subject typical of the Victorian era. Works such as Thoughts of the Past and Rossetti's Found (1855) allowed the genteel gallery-going public to sympathise with societal problems - from a safe distance. It was pictures such as William Holman Hunt's The Awakening Conscience (1854), illustrating a married man and his mistress, which were regarded as threatening to Victorian family life.

Stanhope painted Thoughts of the Past in a studio just above one owned by Rossetti. Although his model is recognisably Pre-Raphaelite, (Note: The original model was Fanny Cornforth. However, the head was later repainted, possibly using Elizabeth Siddal as the model.) the background of his painting hints at his own individual, artistic style, which was yet to emerge. The river, boats and bridge owe more to the conventional style of the art in the Royal Academy than to that of the Pre-Raphaelite Brotherhood.^{see image detail below}

== See also ==
- English art
- List of Pre-Raphaelite paintings
