= Francis Pickering =

English cricketer

Personal information
- Full name: Francis Percy Umfreville Pickering
- Born: 4 August 1851; Shipton, Yorkshire, England
- Died: 11 March 1879 (aged 27); West Chiltington, Sussex, England
- Batting: Right-handed
- Bowling: Right-arm underarm fast
- Relatives: Edward Pickering (uncle); William Pickering (uncle)

Domestic team information
- Years: Team
- 1874–1875: Sussex
- 1873: Oxford University

Career statistics
Competition	First-class
Matches	5
Runs scored	87
Batting average	12.24
100s/50s	–/–
Top score	24
Balls bowled	152
Wickets	8
Bowling average	8.00
5 wickets in innings	–
10 wickets in match	–
Best bowling	4/16
Catches/stumpings	–/–
- Source: Cricinfo, 11 July 2012

Francis Percy Umfreville Pickering (4 August 1851 – 11 March 1879) was an English cricketer. Pickering was a right-handed batsman who bowled right-arm underarm fast. He was born at Shipton, Yorkshire, the son of James Henry Shipton, and was educated at Eton College and Christ Church, Oxford.

While attending the University of Oxford, Pickering made his first-class debut for Oxford University against the Marylebone Cricket Club in 1873 at the Magdalen Ground. In what was his only first-class match for the university, Oxford University won the toss and elected to bat first, making 321/9 declared in their first-innings, with Pickering scoring 9 runs before he was dismissed by Alfred Shaw. The Marylebone Cricket Club responded in their first-innings by making 126 all out, with the Marylebone Cricket Club forced to follow-on in their second-innings, in which they made 255 all out, leaving Oxford University with a target of 61 for victory. The university reached their target with six wickets in hand, however Pickering was dismissed during the chase for 2 runs by Shaw. In that same year he played a first-class match for the Gentlemen of the Marylebone Cricket Club against Kent at the St Lawrence Ground, Canterbury. Kent won the toss and elected to bat first, making 141 all out. The Gentlemen responded to this in their first-innings by making 206 all out, with Pickering scoring 22 runs before he was dismissed by Frederick Stokes. Kent responded in their second-innings by making 171 all out, leaving the Gentlemen with a target of 107 for victory, which they reached with eight wickets in hand.

Pickering made his debut for Sussex in a first-class match against Surrey in 1874 at the County Ground, Hove. He made two further first-class appearances for the county in 1875, both against Kent, with one match played at the Private Banks Sports Ground, Catford Bridge, while the other was played at the County Ground, Hove. In his three first-class appearances for Sussex, he scored 54 runs at an average of 13.50, with a high score of 24. With the ball, he took 8 wickets at a bowling average of 8.00, with best figures of 4/16.

He died at West Chiltington, Sussex, on 11 March 1879. His uncles, Edward Pickering and William Pickering, both played first-class cricket.
