= Listed buildings in Cawthorne =

Cawthorne is a civil parish in the metropolitan borough of Barnsley, South Yorkshire, England. The parish contains 80 listed buildings that are recorded in the National Heritage List for England. Of these, three are listed at Grade II*, the middle of the three grades, and the others are at Grade II, the lowest grade. The parish contains the village of Cawthorne and the surrounding countryside. In the parish is the country house of Cannon Hall, and its grounds, Cannon Hall Park. The hall is listed, together with associated buildings and structures in the park. Most of the other listed buildings are houses, cottages, and associated structures, farmhouses and farm buildings. The other listed buildings include a church and items in the churchyard, particularly grave slabs, bridges, a former corn mill, a former toll house, a guide post and milestones, drinking fountains, sculpted panels in a wall, a well, and a telephone kiosk.

== Key ==
Grade	Criteria
II*	Particularly important buildings of more than special interest
II	Buildings of national importance and special interest

== Buildings ==
Name and location	Photograph	Date	Notes	Grade
Churchyard cross 53.56745°N 1.57160°W	—	11th century (possible)	The cross in the churchyard of All Saints Church has an octagonal base dating from the 19th century, and is in gritstone. It is in four main parts, the main part from a reconstruction. The head has arms of a hammer-head type.	II
All Saints Church; 53.56752°N 1.57102°W		13th century	The church was later altered and extended, and in 1875–80 it was extensively restored and rebuilt by Bodley and Garner. The church is built in stone with a stone slate roof, and consists of a nave, north and south aisles, north and south porches, a chancel with north and south chapels, and a west tower. The tower has two tall stages, diagonal buttresses, a west door, a three-light west window, and an embattled parapet with gargoyles and corner pinnacles. The east window has five lights with a wheel window in the apex.	II*
Seven grave fragments 53.56769°N 1.57104°W	—	13th century (probable)	The seven grave fragments are built into the north wall of the churchyard of All Saints Church. One piece contains the complete figure of a cross, and the other fragments are incomplete, and show parts of crosses and other decorations.	II
The Golden Cross; 53.56895°N 1.57170°W	—	15th century (possible)	The house has a timber framed core, the west wing being the oldest, and the hall range dating from the 16th century. The east wing and rear outshut were added later. The core has largely been encased in brick and stone, with some applied timber framing. There are two storeys, and an H-shaped plan, with a hall range of two bays, gabled cross-wings, and a rear outshut. The doorway in the hall range has a plain surround, and most of the windows are mullioned with two lights.	II
Archway and window fragments, Cannon Hall gardens 53.57101°N 1.58671°W		15th or 16th century	The architectural fragments were moved from elsewhere and set here in the late 19th century to create an archway. They are in stone and consist of part of a three-light Perpendicular window, a small arched window, and an arched doorway.	II
Workshop, Barnby Hall Farm; 53.56930°N 1.55970°W	—	15th or early 16th century	Originally an aisled house, later used for other purposes, it has a timber framed core, it was encased in stone in the 17th or 18th century, and there is some later brickwork. It has three internal bays, a stone slate roof, and a small rear outshut. The building contains a central cart entrance with a timber lintel, a small blocked vent, and a partly blocked entrance with a quoined surround.	II
Archway, Cannon Hall gardens 53.57062°N 1.58725°W		16th century (probable)	The archway is constructed from fragments moved from elsewhere. These were converted into a Gothic arch with some attached stoneware in the late 19th century.	II
Window fragments, Cannon Hall gardens 53.57056°N 1.58702°W		16th century (probable)	The window fragments have been moved from elsewhere, and were assembled on the present site in the late 19th century. They form a tall three-light Perpendicular window with some supporting stonework.	II
Barn east of Upper House Farmhouse; 53.55732°N 1.60397°W	—	16th century (possible)	A cruck barn that was encased in stone in the 19th century, it has quoins, and a stone slate roof. There are five bays, and the barn contains small openings with quoined surrounds. Inside there are four cruck trusses.	II
Grave slab to Shyrte; 53.56736°N 1.57131°W	—	c. 1630	The grave slab in the churchyard of All Saints Church is to the memory of members of the Shyrte, Shirte or Shirt, family. It is in sandstone with inscriptions, and consists of a simple slab with straight incised line borders.	II
Jowett House Farmhouse; 53.56705°N 1.59882°W	—	1633	The farmhouse, which was later extended to the left, is in stone with quoins and a stone slate roof. There are two storeys and an attic. In the earlier part is a datestone and a fire window. The later part has a doorway with a quoined surround. Most of the windows in both parts are mullioned, and at the rear are outshuts.	II
Parish Rooms; 53.56731°N 1.57083°W	—	1639	Originally a grammar school, the parish rooms are in stone with a stone slate roof, and a single storey. The entrance has a chamfered surround and a dated lintel. The windows vary; some are casements, some are mullioned, some are transomed, and some have hood moulds.	II
31 and 33 Darton Road; 53.56912°N 1.56840°W	—	17th century	Two stone houses, with quoins, stone slate roofs with moulded gable copings and moulded kneelers, and two storeys. No. 33 on the right has four bays, a central doorway, sash windows, and a continuous rear outshut. No. 31 forms a gabled cross-wing on the left, and contains mullioned windows, with some mullions removed, and hood moulds.	II
Banks Hall; 53.55513°N 1.57715°W		17th century	A country house, later used for other purposes, the oldest parts are the rear wings, with the front range added in the early 18th century. It is in stone with rusticated quoins, a moulded eaves cornice and blocking course, and a hipped stone slate roof. There are two storeys and an L-shaped plan, with rear infill. The main ranges are symmetrical with seven bays, each with a central porch containing a doorway that has an architrave, and an open segmental pediment on consoles. The windows are sashes with moulded architraves, those in the upper floor with aprons extending to a band.	II
Brook House; 53.56779°N 1.57486°W	—	17th century	The house, which was extended in the 19th century, is in stone with a stone slate roof. There are two storeys, a main range with a short gabled rear wing, and a 19th-century cross-wing is to the left. In the older part are mullioned windows and a doorway.	II
Barn southwest of Brook House; 53.56759°N 1.57512°W	—	17th century	The barn and attached garages, which have been extended, are in stone with some timber framing and weatherboarding, and have a stone slate roof. The openings include stable doors, loft doors, garage doors, and vents.	II
Cinder Hill Farmhouse; 53.57397°N 1.56840°W		17th century	Most of the farmhouse dates from the late 18th century, on an earlier core. It is in stone with quoins and a hipped stone slate roof. There are two storeys, and an L-shaped plan with added wings at the rear. The front is symmetrical with three bays, and it contains a central doorway and sash windows. In the left return is an added brick porch.	II
Barn southeast of Pashley Green Farmhouse; 53.55761°N 1.60892°W	—	17th century	A stone barn with quoins and a stone slate roof. There are three bays, the first bay has an entrance with an oak lintel, and the other bays have a continuous outshut. At the rear is a blocked cart entry and a rectangular vent, and in the right return are two doorways.	II
Upper House Farmhouse; 53.55734°N 1.60437°W	—	17th century	The farmhouse, which was later extended at the rear, is in stone, with quoins, and a stone slate roof with coped gables, moulded kneelers, and apex finials. There are two storeys, two parallel ranges, and a later addition at the rear. The central doorway has a chamfered quoined surround, and the windows are mullioned or mullioned and transomed, with hood moulds. At the rear, external steps lead up to an upper floor doorway.	II
Barn and range, Wool Greaves Farm; 53.55110°N 1.59811°W	—	17th century	The barn and the adjoining range, which is at right angles, are in stone, with quoins, and a stone slate roof. The barn has four bays, and continuous outshuts along both sides and at the rear. It contains square headed cart entries with quoined jambs and an oak lintel, above which is a gabled two-tier dovecote. The range has two storeys and has been much altered. The openings include a central cart entrance and pitching holes, and there are external steps leading to an upper floor doorway.	II
Grave slab to Firth; 53.56733°N 1.57124°W	—	c. 1666	The grave slab in the churchyard of All Saints Church is to the memory of the two wives of Edward Firth. It is in sandstone with an inscription, and consists of a simple slab with simple line decoration.	II
Grave slab to Hewitt; 53.56744°N 1.57085°W	—	c. 1667	The grave slab in the churchyard of All Saints Church is to the memory of Elizabeth Hewitt, and also of Thomas Ostcliffe who died in 1762. It is in sandstone with inscriptions, and consists of a plain slab with a simple line border and simple arched decoration at the top.	II
Grave slab to Moxon; 53.56735°N 1.57110°W	—	c. 1672	The grave slab in the churchyard of All Saints Church is to the memory of Mathenee Moxon, and also of John Winter who died in 1748. It is in sandstone with inscriptions, and consists of a simple slab with arched decoration at the top.	II
Wool Greaves Farmhouse; 53.55120°N 1.59770°W	—	1672	The farmhouse is in stone, with quoins, and a stone slate roof with coped gables, moulded kneelers, and finials. There are two storeys and an L-shaped plan, consisting of a two-bay range, and a gabled cross-wing to the right. The doorway has a quoined surround and a Tudor arched lintel with an inscription, initials and the date. The windows are mullioned, with hood moulds, and in each gable apex is an oculus.	II*
Grave slabs to Dixon; 53.56740°N 1.57091°W	—	1680s	The three grave slabs in the churchyard of All Saints Church are to the memory of members of the Dixon family. They are in sandstone with inscriptions, and have different types of decoration.	II
Jowett House and Cottage; 53.56722°N 1.59867°W		1690	The house was extended in the 18th century, and the cottage was added in the 19th century. The house is in stone with quoins, the left return is rendered, the cottage is in red brick, and the roofs are in stone slate. There are two storeys, the house has four bays, and the cottage has one. At the rear are a two-bay outshut, a single-storey gabled wing, and a lean-to addition. The house has a reset doorway with a quoined and chamfered surround, and a cambered head containing an oval with a date. The windows are mullioned, and those in the cottage have hood moulds.	II
Raised grave slabs to Turton; 53.56735°N 1.57083°W	—	c. 1696	The pair of raised grave slabs are in the churchyard of All Saints Church, and both are to the memory of members of the Turton family. They are in sandstone with inscriptions, on low coursed bases, and both have a simple edge moulding.	II
Barn, Flash House Farm; 53.56157°N 1.59713°W	—	1698	The barn is in stone with quoins and a stone slate roof. There are five bays and continuous front and rear outshuts. In the centre is a gabled cart entry with quoined jambs, and an oak lintel on corbels. In the gable is a dovecote with a stone perch, and an inserted dated and initialled panel. The barn also contains a segmental-arched cart entry at the rear, doorways, windows and slit vents.	II
Cannon Hall; 53.57090°N 1.59054°W		c. 1698–1704	A country house, later a museum, it was extended by John Carr in 1764–76, and a kitchen and stables were added by him in 1778–86. The house is in sandstone, with rusticated quoins, a moulded eaves cornice, and a balustraded parapet. The front is symmetrical with a main block of three storeys and five bays, and flanking two-storey three-bay side wings. The windows are sashes, those in the whole of the ground floor and in the middle floor of the main block with pulvinated friezes and moulded cornices. The middle window in the ground floor also has consoles. In the centre of the rear is a Doric portico.	II*
Upper Norcroft Cottages; 53.55947°N 1.56849°W	—	17th or early 18th century	A pair of stone cottages with quoins, and a stone slate roof with chamfered gable copings and moulded kneelers on the left. There are two storeys and four bays. Each cottage has a doorway with a quoined surround, a two-light window to the right, and a shared stepped hood mould. The other windows have been altered.	II
Grave slabs to Burgon and Robuck; 53.56741°N 1.57143°W	—	c. 1702	The two grave slabs in the churchyard of All Saints Church are to the memory of members of the Burgon and Robuck families. They are in sandstone with inscriptions, the easterly slab has four elliptical panels with decorated borders, and the other slab has simple decoration at the top and a line surround.	II
Raised grave slabs to Turton; 53.56734°N 1.57090°W	—	c. 1703	The pair of raised grave slabs are in the churchyard of All Saints Church, and both are to the memory of members of the Turton family. They are in sandstone with inscriptions and verses, and simple line divisions between the inscriptions.	II
Grave slabs to Newton and Rhoades; 53.56758°N 1.57092°W	—	c. 1716	The pair of grave slabs are in the churchyard of All Saints Church, and both are in sandstone with inscriptions. One is to the memory of members of the Newton family, and also to Thomas Right, who died in 1726, and is plain with some ornamentation at the top. The other slab is to the memory of members of the Rhoades family, and has a moulded surround and an elaborately carved top in relief with flowers and winged angels.	II
Grave slabs to Shaw and Longley; 53.56744°N 1.57084°W	—	c. 1716	The pair of grave slabs are in the churchyard of All Saints Church, and both are in sandstone with inscriptions. One is to the memory of members of the Shaw family, and has a simply moulded edge and rounded top corners. The other is to the memory of members of the Longley family, and has a decorative surround which is arched at the top.	II
Flash House Farmhouse and cottage 53.56141°N 1.59681°W	—	1729	The farmhouse and adjoining cottage, which is probably older, are in stone with quoins, the cottage is rendered, the roofs are in stone slate, and both have two storeys. The house has a floor band, coped gables with moulded kneelers, and a symmetrical front of three bays. The central doorway has a plain surround and a dated and initialled keystone. Above the doorway is a cross window, to its right are two sash windows, and the other windows are mullioned. The cottage, recessed to the right, has been much altered. It has two bays, the right wider and gabled, and contains a doorway and mullioned windows.	II
Grave slab to Streete; 53.56741°N 1.57099°W	—	c. 1729	The grave slab in the churchyard of All Saints Church is to the memory of members of the Streete family, and also to Martha Milner who died in 1776. It is in sandstone with inscriptions, and consists of a simple slab with arched decoration at the top.	II
Golden Cross Cottage; 53.56912°N 1.57148°W	—	1735	A stone house with quoins and a stone slate roof. There are two storeys, a symmetrical front of three bays, and a continuous outshut at the rear. The central doorway has a quoined surround and an initialled and dated raised keystone. The windows have three lights, and the mullions have been removed.	II
Raised grave slab to Swift; 53.56741°N 1.57098°W	—	c. 1741	The raised grave slab in the churchyard of All Saints Church is to the memory of members of the Swift family. It is in sandstone with inscriptions, and a moulded edge continued to form an arch at the top.	II
Grave slabs to Rich; 53.56736°N 1.57096°W	—	c. 1746	The four grave slabs in the churchyard of All Saints Church are to the memory of members of the Rich family. They are in sandstone with inscriptions, and consist of slabs with moulded edges and elaborate arched decoration at the top.	II
Kexbrough Bridge; 53.57556°N 1.55560°W	—	18th century (probable)	The bridge carries Cawthorne Lane over Cawthorne Dike. It is in stone and consists of a single round arch. The parapet has a band and chamfered copings, and there are three end piers with pyramidal caps.	II
Raised grave slabs to Clegg; 53.56741°N 1.57092°W	—	c. 1757	The pair of raised grave slabs are in the churchyard of All Saints Church, and both are to the memory of members of the Clegg family. They are in sandstone with inscriptions, and have moulded edges of relief decoration to the tops.	II
Camelia House, hot-house and hot wall, Cannon Hall; 53.57107°N 1.58956°W		1761	Camelia House is in red brick with stone dressings, on a two-step podium, with a moulded wooden cornice, and a segmental-arched gable, and it contains a segmental-arched window with a moulded surround. The hot wall to the right is in red brick, it steps down towards the hot house, and contains a round-arched entrance with a Gibbs surround with wrought iron gates on each side of the hot house. The hot house has lost its glazing and roof, and consists of five Ionic piers, each with a plain frieze, a cornice, and a blocking course.	II
Ha-ha, Cannon Hall park 53.57076°N 1.58872°W	—	1761	The ha-ha runs to the south of the hall and to the east of the gardens, separating the gardens from the parkland. It is in stone with flat coping, and is up to 2 metres (6 ft 7 in) in height.	II
Cascade Bridge; 53.56688°N 1.58951°W		1761–62	The bridge carries Bark House Lane over Daking Brook. It is in stone with vermiculated dressings, and consists of a single elliptical arch. The voussoirs and the intermediate and terminal piers have alternate blocking, the parapet has a band and a coped balustrade, and the ends are curved and splayed.	II
Cannon Hall Farmhouse and ranges 53.57155°N 1.59004°W	—	1760s (probable)	The farmhouse, adjoining range and stable range form three sides of a courtyard. They are in red brick on a plinth, with a stone slate roof, and two storeys. The openings include sash windows, a shallow-arched carriageway, and doorways, and in the stable range are elliptical-headed windows and slit vents.	II
East-west range, Cannon Hall; 53.57124°N 1.58998°W	—	1760s (probable)	Originally houses, later used for other purposes, the building is in red brick with stone dressings and a stone slate roof. There are two storeys, six bays, with a further two bays to the right containing a shallow-arched carriageway. The three doorways have moulded jambs and fanlights, the middle doorway also has a keystone and a cornice. The windows are sashes.	II
Former coach house, Cannon Hall; 53.57128°N 1.59029°W	—	1760s (probable)	The former coach house is in red brick with stone dressings, stone at the rear, and a hipped stone slate roof. There are two storeys and a symmetrical front of nine bays, the middle three bays projecting under a pediment with an oculus in the tympanum. There are five large carriage openings, each with a tympanum containing a segmental-arched fixed light. The windows are a mix of sashes and fixed lights.	II
Footbridge, Cannon Hall park 53.56936°N 1.58113°W		1764–65	The footbridge crossing a pond is in stone and consists of a single segmental arch. The bridge has slightly projecting voussoirs forming a band, low coping, and wavy iron railings. The ends of the bridge are splayed and end in octagonal piers with domed heads.	II
Raised grave slab to Moakson; 53.56739°N 1.57086°W	—	c. 1767	The raised grave slab in the churchyard of All Saints Church is to the memory of members of the Moakson family. It is in sandstone with inscriptions, and a moulded edge, and is divided into two, each half with raised decoration at the top and stylised winged angels in the top corners.	II
Raised grave slab to Cudworth; 53.56741°N 1.57085°W	—	c. 1770	The raised grave slab in the churchyard of All Saints Church is to the memory of Timothy Cudworth and his wife. It is in sandstone with inscriptions, and has a moulded edge, and relief ornamentation at the top.	II
Dovecote and cart house, Banks Hall Farm; 53.55543°N 1.57779°W	—	Late 18th century	The cart house and dovecote are in stone with quoins, and stone slate roofs. The cart house has two storeys and one bay, and it contains a flat-arched cart entry with quoined jambs. The dovecote has a pyramidal roof, and both parts have lunette windows.	II
Barn east of Barnby Hall Farmhouse; 53.56907°N 1.55956°W	—	Late 18th century	A brick barn with a stone slate roof, two storeys and five bays. It contains a central basket-arched cart entry, pitching holes, and slit vents.	II
Barn northeast of Barnby Hall Farmhouse; 53.56936°N 1.55921°W	—	Late 18th century (probable)	A brick barn with a stone slate roof, two storeys and four bays. It contains a basket-arched cart entry, and vents, some of which are slits and others have diamond honey-comb brickwork.	II
Ha-ha and garden wall, Cinder Hill Farmhouse; 53.57375°N 1.56797°W	—	Late 18th century	The ha-ha curves in front of the house, it is in stone, and contains central square gate piers with domed tops, and a footbridge. At the east end it ramps up to become a garden wall. This is in red brick with a stone face and coping, and it contains traces of flues. At the west end, where it joins the house, is an entrance with a quoined surround.	II
Dovecote, Jowett House Cottage; 53.56728°N 1.59839°W		Late 18th century	The lower part of the dovecote is in stone with quoins, the upper part is in red brick, and the roof is in stone slate. In the gable end is a part-blocked elliptical-arched cart entrance, at the rear is a two-light window, and there is a bird opening and ledge in the gable. On the right side are external steps leading to an upper doorway.	II
Red House; 53.56840°N 1.57173°W	—	Late 18th century	A house in red brick with stone dressings, rusticated quoins, a floor band, a moulded eaves cornice, and a stone slate roof with coped gables and moulded kneelers. There are two storeys and attics, a double-depth plan, a symmetrical front of three bays, and two bays on the sides. The central doorway has a moulded surround and a cornice on console brackets, and the windows are sashes. In the left return is a doorway and a two-storey canted bay window, and in the right return is a doorway with a quoined surround and a round-arched stair window.	II
Tower Cottage; 53.57211°N 1.59867°W		Late 18th century	A folly, later a private house, it is in stone, with quoins, embattled parapets, and a Welsh slate roof, and is in Gothic style. In the centre is a two-storey tower with a pyramidal roof. This contains a Gothic archway, later infilled with glazing, and in the upper floor is a quatrefoil on each side. The tower is flanked by recessed single-storey wings. The right wing has a cross-shaped slit window, and in the left wing are sash windows.	II
Gardener's Cottage, Cannon Hall gardens 53.57116°N 1.58996°W	—	Late 18th or early 19th century	The cottage is in stone with quoins and a stone slate roof. There are two storeys, a symmetrical front of three bays, and a rear outshut. In the ground floor are sash windows, the upper floor windows have two lights, with mullions removed, and in the outshut is an elliptical-headed cart entry.	II
North Lodge; 53.57698°N 1.59601°W	—	Late 18th or early 19th century	A pair of lodges at the north entrance to the grounds of Cannon Hall and a linking gateway. The lodges are in stone with Welsh slate roofs and a single storey. The south lodge has a pyramidal roof, and the doorway has pilaster jambs and a triangular pediment. The side fronts contain a sash window in a round-arched archivolted panel. The north lodge is similar, with a basement, and has been extended to the north, giving a hipped roof. Between the lodges is a stone wall containing two square gate piers with ball finials.	II
Pashley Green Farmhouse and range 53.55777°N 1.60917°W	—	Late 18th or early 19th century	The farmhouse and adjoining range are in stone with quoins and a Welsh slate roof. There are two storeys, and a T-shaped plan; the house has two bays, the attached range has three bays, and there is a rear wing. In the front of the house and at the rear of the range are doorways with quoined surrounds, and the windows are mullioned.	II
Barns and stabling, Upper Elmhirst Farm; 53.55017°N 1.60368°W	—	Late 18th or early 19th century	The barns and stabling are in stone with a stone slate roof, hipped at the right end. There are two storeys, and they form an L-shaped plan. The buildings contain two segmental-arched cart entries with quoined jambs, doorways with quoined surrounds, square pitching holes, and round-arched ventilation loops.	II
Barnby Hall and archway 53.56855°N 1.56040°W	—	c. 1820	The house is in stone, in Jacobean style, and has a stone slate roof with coped gables, moulded kneelers, and finials. There are two storeys and attics and three bays, the outer bays gabled. The doorway has chamfered jambs, an arched head with sunken spandrels, and a hood mould. To the right is a mullioned and transomed hall window, and the other windows are mullioned. At the rear is a doorway approached by four round steps, and attached to the house is a reset arch that may be medieval.	II
Tomb chest 53.56740°N 1.57116°W	—	c. 1820	The tomb chest in the churchyard of All Saints Church is to the memory of members of the Marshall family. It is in sandstone with inscriptions, and has a square moulded base and a decorative frieze. The sides are divided into two, each part has an elliptical panel, and there are vase-like colonnettes at the corners.	II
South Lodge; 53.56665°N 1.57630°W		c. 1820	The refronting of an earlier house, it is in stone, with corner buttresses rising to pinnacles, a band, a plain parapet with moulded coping, and a stone slate roof. There are two storeys, a symmetrical front of three bays, and a later rear wing. In the centre is a porch that has a doorway with a moulded surround and a Tudor arched head with shields in the spandrels, above which is a gabled dormer. The windows are mullioned with hood moulds, continuous in the upper floor.	II
Gardener's cottage, walls and ha-ha, Cannon Hall Nurseries; 53.57048°N 1.59545°W	—	Early 19th century (probable)	The cottage is in red brick with stone dressings and a stone slate roof. There are two storeys and two bays, and the gable end is built into the garden wall. The middle light of a tripartite window has been converted into a doorway, and in the upper floor is a two-light window set in a segmental-arched panel. The wall is in brick with stone coping, and the north wall contains the remains of fireplaces and flues. The stone ha-ha forms the south wall of the garden.	II
Deer Shelter, Cannon Hall Park; 53.56908°N 1.59194°W		Early to mid 19th century	The deer shelter is in stone with a stone slate roof. There is one storey and a symmetrical front of seven bays, the middle five bays open. The roof is carried on four yew trunks. The outer bays are gabled, and each contains a two-light window with a pointed arch containing Y-tracery, and in the gable apex is a slit.	II
Folly, Deffer Woods; 53.57335°N 1.60531°W		Early to mid 19th century	The folly is a circular structure with a stone back wall. The front is open, and contains four yew trunks on stone footings. These support a conical roof in stone slate in the lower courses, and with tiles above.	II
Jowett Saw Mill; 53.56643°N 1.58926°W	—	Early to mid 19th century	A corn mill, then a saw mill, it was extended in 1858, and later converted into a private house. It is in stone, partly rendered, with a brick rear wing, and a stone slate roof. The original part has two storeys, and the extension has one storey and an attic with dormers. The original part has two bays and contains Gothic-arched windows. The later range has quoins, an L-shaped plan, and a main range of six bays. The doorways and windows have round-arched heads.	II
Park House; 53.56321°N 1.58619°W	—	Mid 19th century	A house, later divided, in stone, with quoins, and a stone slate roof with coped gables and moulded kneelers. There are two storeys and a T-shaped Plan, consisting of a main range with three bays, a gabled cross-wing on the left, and a rear wing. On the main range is a porch and a doorway with a cambered head, and the windows are mullioned with hood moulds.	II
Toll-bar Cottage; 53.56245°N 1.57975°W		Mid 19th century	The former toll house, later a private house, is in stone, and has a stone slate roof with shaped gable copings on moulded kneelers. There is a single storey and a rectangular plan, with a front of two bays. On the front is a canted bay window, and to its left is a window with a chamfered surround, both with hood moulds. In the centre of the roof is a pair of ornamental chimney stacks.	II
Guide post 53.56731°N 1.56956°W		Mid to late 19th century (probable)	The guide post is at a road junction, and is in stone, with a square plan and a pyramidal top. It is inscribed on two sides with pointing hands, and the directions to Penistone, Huddersfield, and Barnsley.	II
Milestone near junction with Coach Gate Lane; 53.56290°N 1.61410°W		Mid to late 19th century	The milestone is on the south side of Lane Head Road (A635 road). It is in stone with cast iron overlay, and has a triangular plan and a rounded top. On the top is inscribed "BARNSLEY & SHEPLEY", "LANE HEAD ROAD" and "CAWTHORNE", and in the sides are the distances to Denby Dale, Cawthorne, Holmfirth, and Barnsley.	II
Milestone at Clough Green; 53.56114°N 1.59133°W		Mid to late 19th century	The milestone is on the north side of Lane Head Road (A635 road). It is in stone with cast iron overlay, and has a triangular plan and a rounded top. On the top is inscribed "BARNSLEY & SHEPLEY", "LANE HEAD ROAD" and "CAWTHORNE", and in the sides are the distances to Denby Dale, Cawthorne, Holmfirth, and Barnsley.	II
Milestone opposite 9 Malt Kiln Row; 53.56845°N 1.57229°W		Mid to late 19th century	The milestone is on the west side of Malt Kiln Row. It is in stone with cast iron overlay, and has a triangular plan and a rounded top. On the top is inscribed "BARNSLEY & SHEPLEY", "LANE HEAD ROAD" and "CAWTHORNE", and in the sides are the distances to Denby Dale, Holmfirth, and Barnsley.	II
Milestone east of Barnby Hall Farm; 53.56807°N 1.54991°W		Mid to late 19th century	The milestone is on the north side of Lane Head Road (A635 road). It is in stone with cast iron overlay, and has a triangular plan and a rounded top. On the top is inscribed "BARNSLEY & SHEPLEY", "LANE HEAD ROAD" and "CAWTHORNE", and in the sides are the distances to Denby Dale, Cawthorne, Holmfirth, and Barnsley.	II
Drinking fountain 53.56829°N 1.57118°W		1866	The drinking fountain was designed by George Shaw, and is in the form of an Anglo-Scandinavian standing cross. It is in sandstone, and has a podium of five steps, and an ornately carved base containing a water trough on the north side. The cross head and shaft are richly carved, the head with interlacing patterns, and the shaft with serpent motifs. At the bottom of the shaft is a panel inscribed with a biblical text.	II
Garden wall with sculpted panels and figures 53.56752°N 1.57331°W	—	Late 19th century	Set into a garden wall in Taylor Hill are four panels containing relief sculptures by a local artist. Surmounting the wall are four figures depicting lions.	II
Well at side of road 53.56894°N 1.56848°W	—	1881	The well outside No. 30 Darton Road consists of a stone trough that has a triangular pediment with the date in the tympanum. Stone steps lead down into the trough, and these are enclosed on two sides by a low chamfered stone wall.	II
Lion's Head drinking fountain 53.56894°N 1.57040°W		1890	The drinking fountain consists of a cast iron plate set in a wall. The plate has an embossed lion's head, a plunger, and a cup on a chain. It is set in a recess with a quoined rock-faced surround and an ogee head.	II
Telephone kiosk 53.56886°N 1.57130°W		1935	The K6 type telephone kiosk outside the Post Office, was designed by Giles Gilbert Scott. It is constructed in cast iron with a square plan and a dome, and has three unperforated crowns in the top panels.	II
