= Walter Ramsden =

British biochemist and physiologist

Walter Ramsden (4 October 1868 – 26 March 1947) was a British biochemist and physiologist. He discovered the phenomenon now known as Pickering stabilization in 1903, before the effect was independently rediscovered by Spencer U. Pickering in 1907.

At age 14, Ramsden withdrew from Manchester Grammar School to study privately at home, due to problems with his eyesight. He matriculated at Keble College, Oxford and graduated in 1892 with a 1st Class in the school of physiology. By means of a Radcliffe Travelling Fellowship in Medical Sciences he studied from 1893 to 1896 at Zürich, at Vienna, and then at Guy's Hospital, qualifying M.B., B.Ch. in 1897 and graduating D.M. (Oxford) in 1902. In 1899 he was elected a Sheppard Medical Fellow of Pembroke College, Oxford and held the Fellowship until his death. At Oxford he was a lecturer in physiological chemistry under Francis Gotch until 1913 and under C. S. Sherrington during the academic year 1913–1914.

Ramsden was a founder member of the Biochemical Society in 1911. He was Johnston Professor of Biochemistry at the University of Liverpool from 1914 until his retirement in 1931. His predecessor was Benjamin Moore and his successor was Harold Channon (1897–1979).

Ramsden's research was mainly on the chemistry of proteins and the theory of emulsions. He was one of the first to appreciate the importance of physico-chemical surface studies in biology, particularly in relation to protein chemistry. After his retirement back to Oxford he worked particularly on the proteins of silk.

John Betjeman wrote a poem I.M. Walter Ramsden ob. March 26, 1947 Pembroke College, Oxford on the occasion of Ramsden's death, having been inspired by an obituary by R.B. McCallum in The Oxford Magazine.
