= Richard St John Tyrwhitt =

English cleric and academic (1827–1895)

Richard St John Tyrwhitt (19 March 1827 – 6 December 1895) was an English cleric and author. He was known as a writer on art.

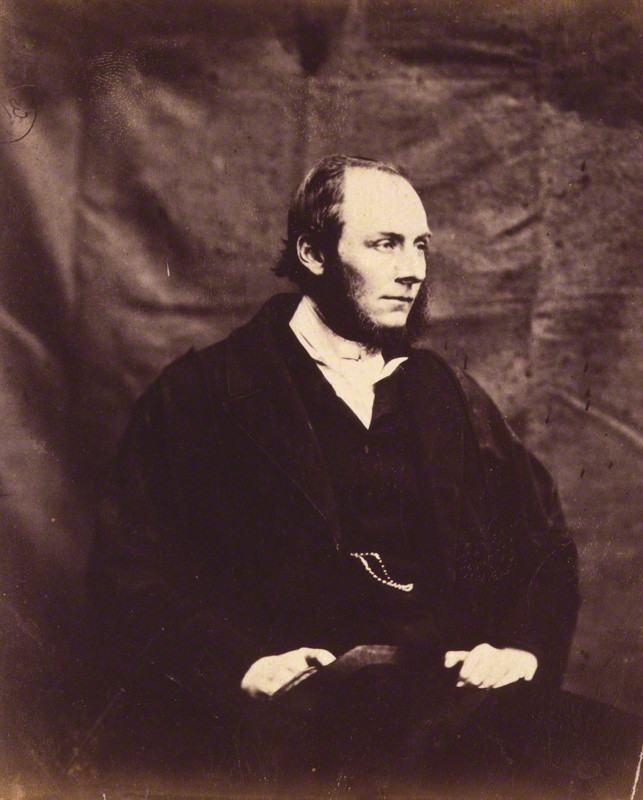
Richard St John Tyrwhitt, 1857 photograph by Charles Lutwidge Dodgson

== Early life ==
Tyrwhitt was born on 19 March 1827. He was the eldest son of Robert Philip Tyrwhitt (1798–1886), a police magistrate, and his wife Catherine Wigley, daughter of Henry St. John. He matriculated at Christ Church, Oxford on 15 May 1845, was a student from 1845 to 1859, tutor from 1852 to 1856, and rhetoric reader in 1856. He graduated with a B.A. in 1849 and an M.A. in 1852.

== Career ==
In 1851, Tyrwitt was ordained. From 1858 to 1872, he held the vicarage of St Mary Magdalen's Church, Oxford. In 1857, Tyrwhitt assisted William Morris in painting the roof of the Oxford Union Society.

Tyrwhitt was an admirer of John Ruskin, in whose favour he withdrew his candidature for the Slade Professorship of Fine Art in 1869.

During the contested 1877 election for the Oxford Professorship of Poetry, Tyrwhitt attacked John Addington Symonds, a candidate, in a piece "The Greek Spirit in Modern Literature" in the Contemporary Review. The argument also took in Benjamin Jowett, suspected of unorthodox religious views; Symonds found it telling, and withdrew his candidacy shortly before the election. Tyrwhitt's piece has been characterised as homophobic, and caused the withdrawal of Walter Pater too. Also in the Contemporary Review, he argued in 1878 that belief in evolution was compatible with Christianity, and that John Tyndall was incorrect in thinking otherwise.

Tyrwhitt's friendship with John Henry Parker led Tyrwhitt into the debate over the Roman catacombs and their significance. He tried to keep to a middle, non-sectarian way of interpretation, following Henry Reeve, with emphasis on the evidence of growth of early Christianity.

== Works ==
Tyrwhitt was the author of A Handbook of Pictorial Art (1866; 2nd edit. 1868): it was adopted by the Science and Art Department as a textbook. In addition to sermons, he published also:

- Concerning Clerical Powers and Duties, 1861.
- Fragments, 1867. Poems.
- Christian Art and Symbolism, with Hints on the Study of Landscape, 1872 (preface by Ruskin).
- The Art Teaching of the Primitive Church, 1874.
- Our Sketching Club: Letters and Studies in Landscape Art, with a Reproduction of the Lessons and Woodcuts in Ruskin's "Elements of Drawing", 1874. Unfavourably reviewed by William Bell Scott, it caused a controversy between Scott and Ruskin.
- Hugh Heron, Ch. Ch.: an Oxford Novel, 1880.
- Greek and Gothic: Progress and Decay in the three Arts of Architecture, Sculpture, and Painting, 1881.
- The Natural Theology of Natural Beauty, 1882.
- Christian Ideals and Hopes: an Argument from Moral Beauty, 1883.
- An Amateur Art Book: Lectures, 1886.
- Free Field Lyrics, chiefly descriptive, 1888.

To Francis Galton's Vacation Tourists, 1864, Tyrwhitt contributed an account of a visit to Sinai. He exhibited watercolours at the Royal Academy and Suffolk Street Gallery. He also painted murals, for example in the Oxford Museum.

Tyrwhitt wrote for periodicals, for example on art criticism in the Contemporary Review. He also contributed to the Dictionary of Christian Antiquities, and to the Dictionary of Christian Biography.

== Personal life ==
Tyrwhitt married, first, on 28 June 1858, Eliza Ann, daughter of John Spencer Stanhope of Cannon Hall, Yorkshire. She died on 8 September 1859, leaving a son, Walter Spencer Stanhope, a lieutenant in the Warwick militia. By a second marriage, on 2 January 1861, to Caroline (died 1883), youngest daughter of John Yorke of Bewerley Hall, Yorkshire, he had six children.

Between 1864 and 1880, Tywhitt exhibited two watercolours at the Royal Academy and two at the Suffolk Street Gallery. He was accounted a member of the Guild of St George in 1876. He was a member of the committee for the decoration of St Paul's Cathedral.

Tyrwhitt died at 62 Banbury Road, Oxford, on 6 December 1895. and was buried in Holywell Cemetery.
