= Oxford Union murals =

Series of murals in Oxford, England

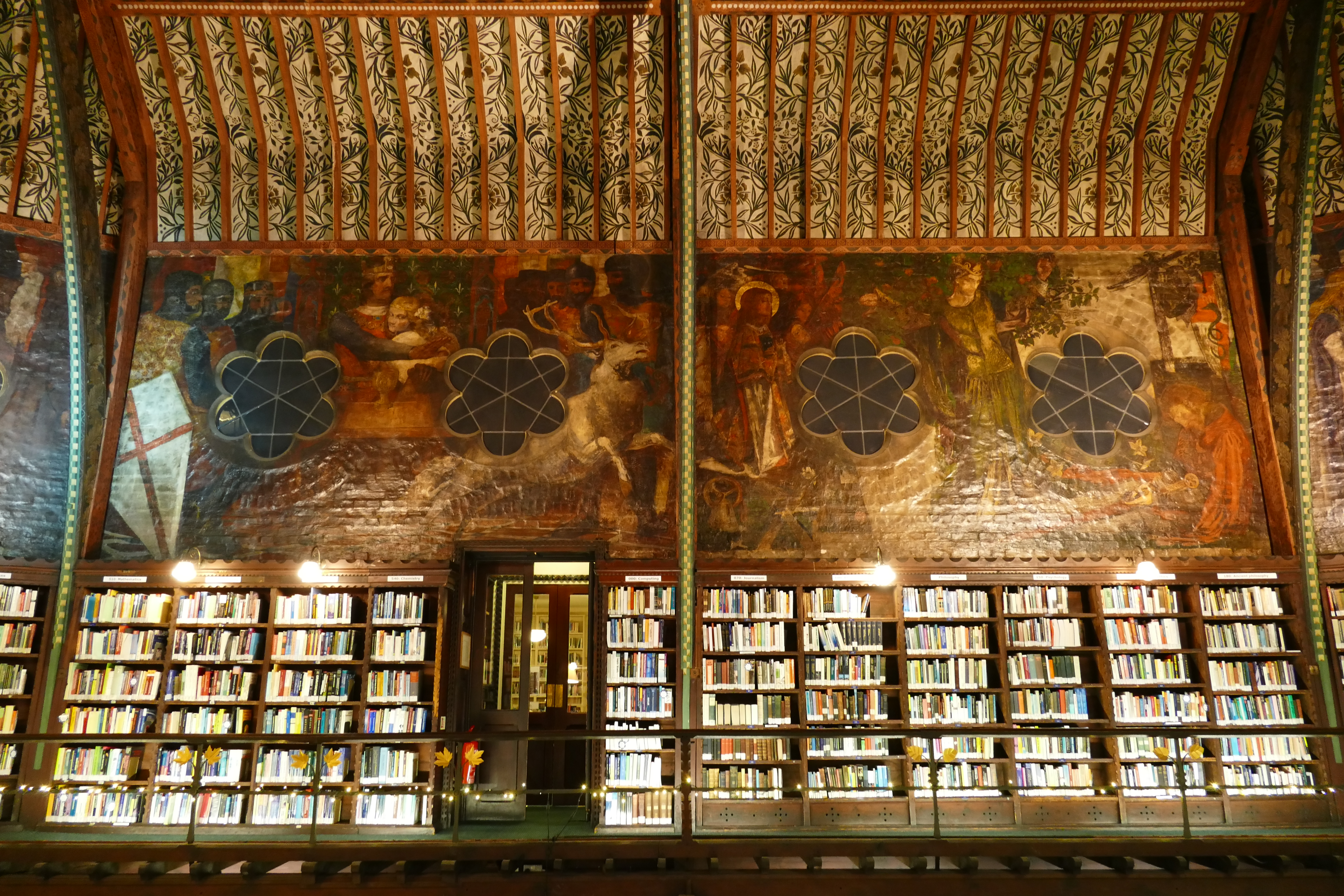
The unfinished mural painted by Rossetti

Rossetti's design for Sir Lancelot's Vision of the Holy Grail

The Oxford Union murals (1857–1859) are a series of mural decorations in the Oxford Union library building. The series was executed by a team of Pre-Raphaelite artists including Dante Gabriel Rossetti, William Morris and Edward Burne-Jones. The paintings depict scenes from Arthurian myth.

The murals were commissioned by John Ruskin and the subject was probably chosen as a result of earlier Pre-Raphaelite interest in Arthurian themes, such as the illustrations to Edward Moxon's 1857 edition of Tennyson. In addition to Rossetti, Morris and Burne-Jones, several other artists agreed to contribute. These were the painters Val Prinsep, Arthur Hughes, J. H. Pollen, John Roddam Spencer Stanhope and the sculptor Alexander Munro.

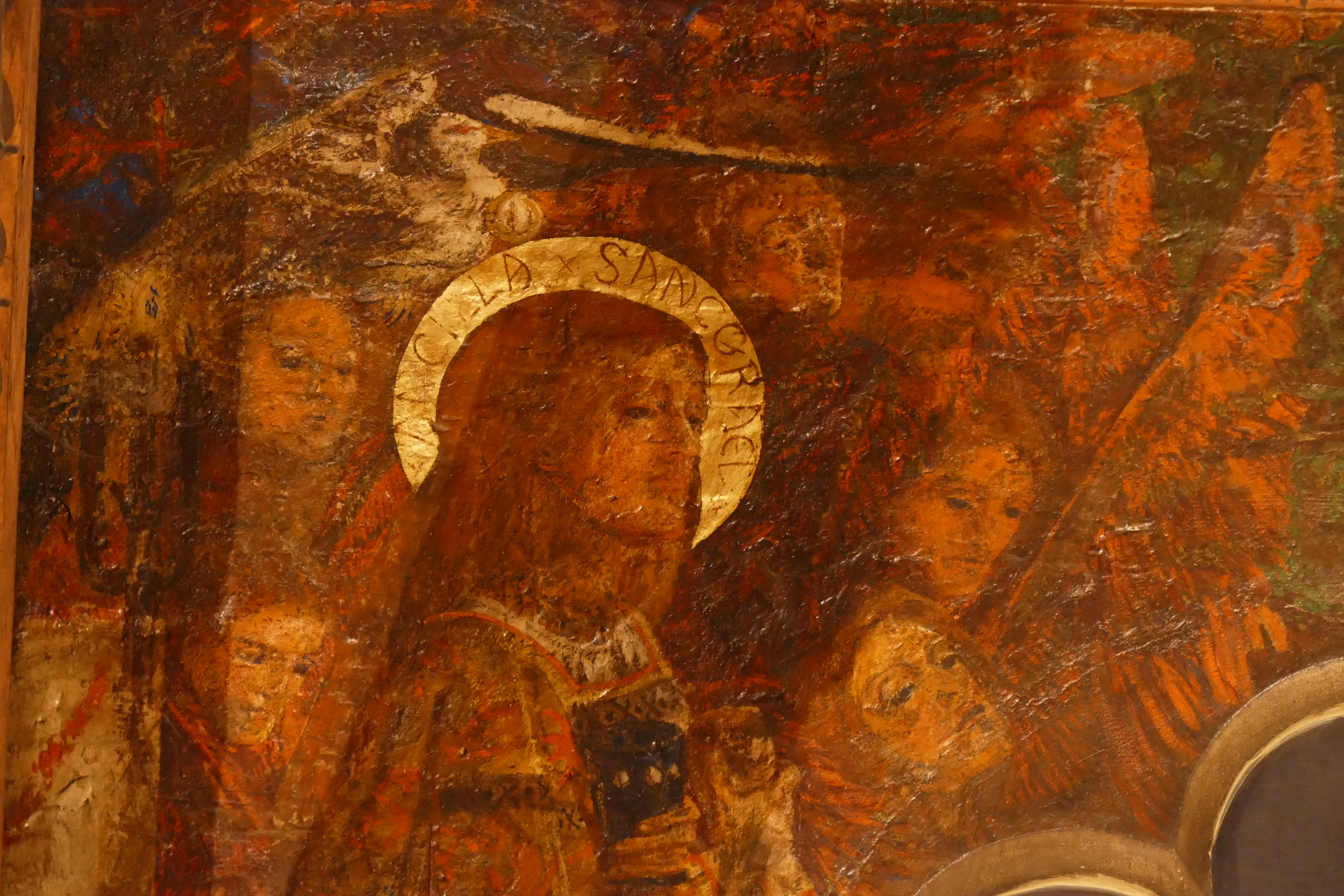
A close up of Jane Burden, later Morris, in Rossetti's Sir Lancelot's Vision of the Holy Grail

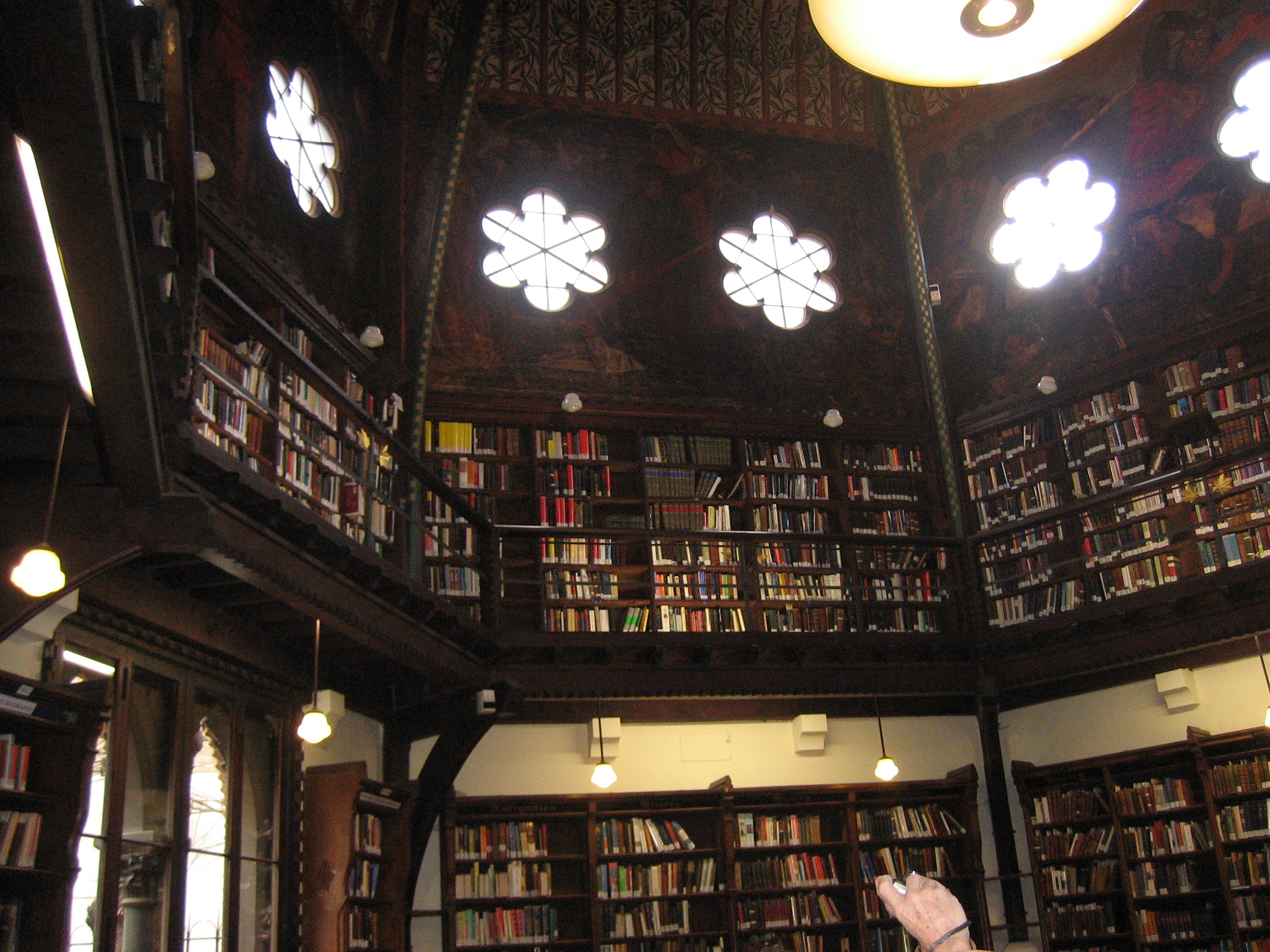
The murals compete with the light from the windows

The process of painting the murals was notoriously chaotic. Ruskin said that the artists were "all the least bit crazy and it's very difficult to manage them." As the murals were painted directly onto the wall without plaster or adequate underpainting they began to suffer decay very quickly. William Morris later completely repainted his design for the ceiling.

Rossetti's main work was Sir Lancelot's Vision of the Holy Grail. Burne-Jones painted Nimue brings Sir Peleus to Ettarde after their Quarrel. Morris executed Sir Palomides' jealousy of Sir Tristram and Iseult, though his work has been described as “poorly and clumsily painted, but the background of leaves and flowers” revealed his skills in design.

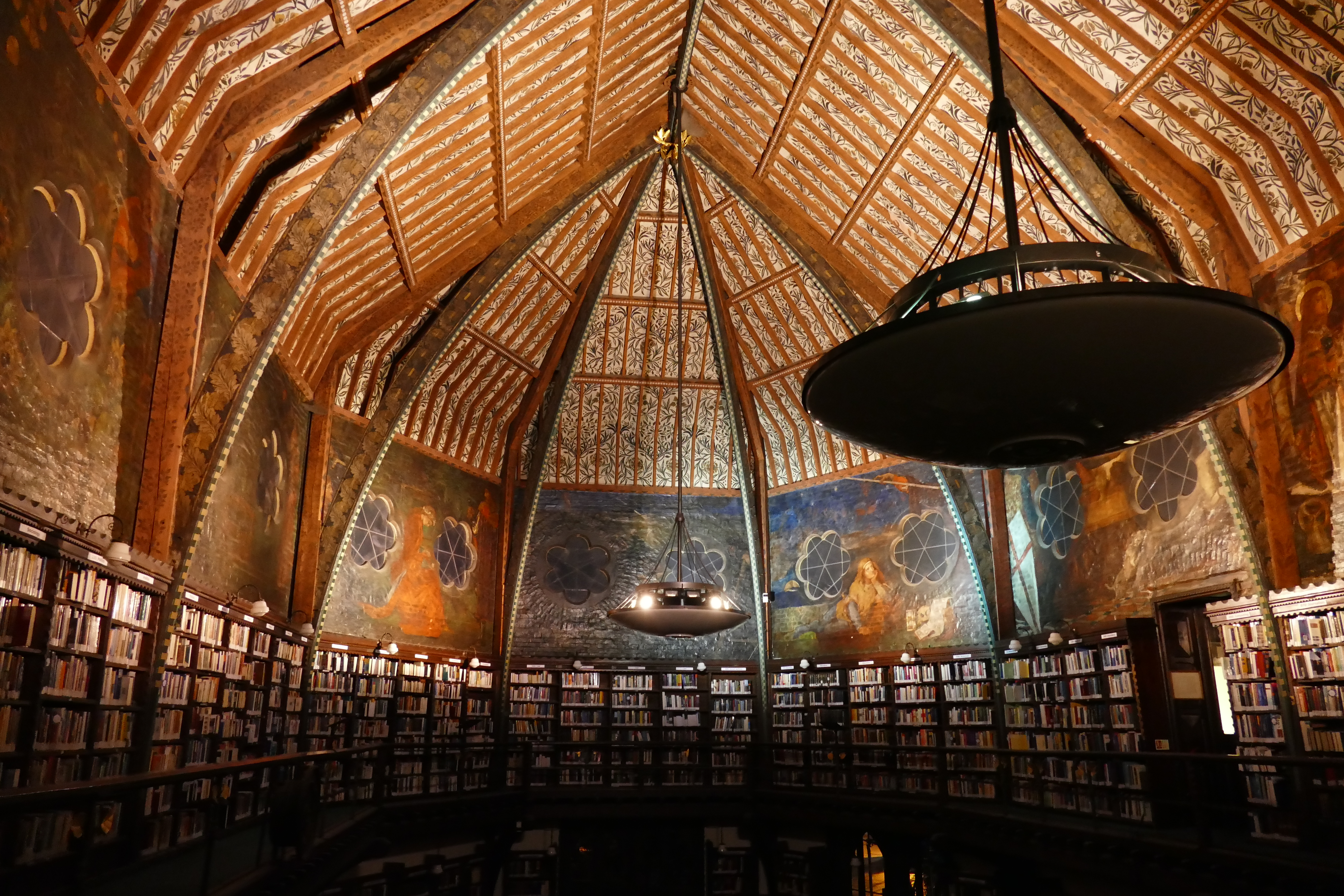
A view of the murals of the Oxford Union Society Library at night time

Jane Burden, who would later marry William Morris, first appears as a model in the Oxford murals. Burden was noticed by Rossetti and Burne-Jones when she was visiting an Oxford theatre with her sister. Struck by Jane's beauty, they sought her to model for them.

In 1906 Rossetti's Pre-Raphaelite colleague William Holman Hunt, who had not been directly involved, wrote a book on the history of the decorations.

== See also ==
- List of paintings by Dante Gabriel Rossetti
- List of paintings by Edward Burne-Jones
