= Pickering emulsion =

Type of emulsion

A Pickering emulsion, sometimes called Ramsden emulsion, is an emulsion stabilized by solid particles (for example colloidal silica) which adsorb onto the interface between the water and oil phases. Typically, the emulsions are either water-in-oil or oil-in-water emulsions, but other more complex systems such as water-in-water, oil-in-oil, water-in-oil-in-water, and oil-in-water-in-oil also do exist.

== Discovery ==
Pickering emulsions were named after S.U. Pickering, who described the phenomenon in 1907, although the effect was first recognized by Walter Ramsden in 1903.

== Structure ==
If oil and water are mixed and small oil droplets are formed and dispersed throughout the water (oil-in-water emulsion), eventually the droplets will coalesce to decrease the amount of energy in the system. However, if solid particles are added to the mixture, they will bind to the surface of the interface and prevent the droplets from coalescing, making the emulsion more stable.

Particle properties such as hydrophobicity, shape, and size, as well as the electrolyte concentration of the continuous phase and the volume ratio of the two phases can have an effect on the stability of the emulsion. The particle's contact angle to the surface of the droplet is a characteristic of the hydrophobicity of the particle. If the contact angle of the particle to the interface is low, the particle will be mostly wetted by the droplet and therefore will not be likely to prevent coalescence of the droplets. Particles that are partially hydrophobic are better stabilizers because they are partially wettable by both liquids and therefore bind better to the surface of the droplets. The optimal contact angle for a stable emulsion is achieved when the particle is equally wetted by the two phases (i.e. 90° contact angle). The stabilization energy is given by

$$\Delta E\ = \pi r^2\gamma_{OW}(1-|\cos{\theta_{OW}}|)^2$$

where r is the particle radius, $\gamma_{OW}$ is the interfacial tension, and $\theta_{OW}$ is the contact angle of the particle with the interface.

When the contact angle is approximately 90°, the energy required to stabilize the system is at its minimum. Generally, the phase that preferentially wets the particle will be the continuous phase in the emulsion system.

Additionally, it has been demonstrated that the stability of the Pickering emulsions can be improved by the use of amphiphilic "Janus particles", namely particles that have one hydrophobic and one hydrophilic side, due to the higher adsorption energy of the particles at the liquid-liquid interface. This is evident when observing emulsion stabilization using polyelectrolytes.

== Examples ==
The most common type of Pickering emulsions are oil-in-water emulsions due to the hydrophilicity of most organic particles. One system commonly studied is an emulsion of hexane in water, with colloidal silica as the Pickering particle.

Another more complex example of a Pickering-stabilized emulsion is homogenized milk. The milk protein (casein) units are adsorbed at the surface of the milk fat globules and act as surfactants. The casein replaces the milkfat globule membrane, which is damaged during homogenization.

Other emulsions stabilized by Pickering particles include detergents, low-fat chocolates, mayonnaises, and margarines.

== Applications ==
Pickering emulsions find applications for enhanced oil recovery or water remediation. Certain Pickering emulsions remain stable even under gastric conditions and show an extraordinary resistance against gastric lipolysis, facilitating their use for controlled lipid digestion and satiation or oral delivery systems.

Pickering emulsions have gained increased attention and research interest during the last 20 years when the use of traditional surfactants was questioned due to environmental, health and cost issues. Synthetic nanoparticles as Pickering emulsion stabilizers with well-defined sizes and compositions have been the primarily particles of interest until recently when also natural organic particles have gained increased attention. They are believed to have advantages such as cost-efficiency and degradability, and are issued from renewable resources.

It is also possible to use latex particles for Pickering stabilization and then fuse these particles to form a permeable shell or capsule, called a colloidosome. Moreover, Pickering emulsion droplets are also suitable templates for micro-encapsulation and the formation of closed, non-permeable capsules. This form of encapsulation can also be applied to water-in-water emulsions (dispersions of phase-separated aqueous polymer solutions), and can also be reversible. Pickering-stabilized microbubbles may have applications as ultrasound contrast agents.

== See also ==
- Liquid marbles
