= A. M. W. Stirling =

British writer and art collector

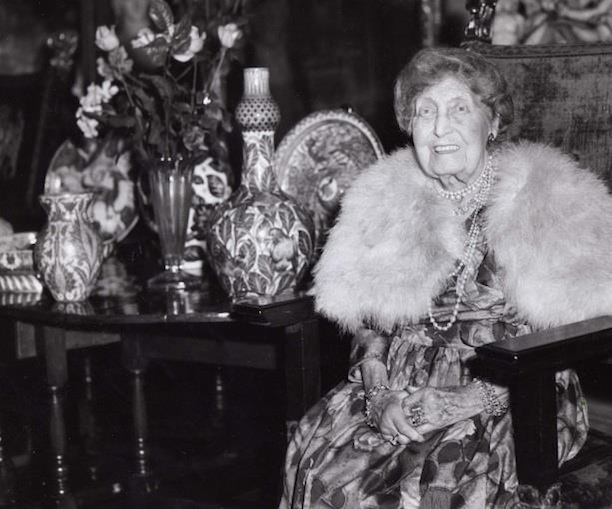
- Born: Anna Marie Diana Wilhelmina Pickering; 26 August 1865; London, England
- Died: 11 August 1965 (aged 99); Heidelberg, Germany
- Occupations: Author and art benefactor
- Relatives: Percival Pickering (father); Evelyn De Morgan (sister); John Roddam Spencer Stanhope (uncle)
- Writing career
- Language: English

Anna Marie Diana Wilhelmina Stirling (née Pickering; 26 August 1865 – 11 August 1965), also known as Wilhelmina Stirling and under the alias Percival Pickering, was a British writer and art collector. A greater part of her books dealt with the lives and reminiscences of the British landed gentry of Yorkshire. She was the founder of the De Morgan Collection.

== Biography ==
Stirling (then Pickering) was born to Anna Marie Wilhelmina Spencer Stanhope (1824–1901) and the lawyer and cricketer Percival Pickering (1810–1876). Her mother was a granddaughter of Thomas William Coke, 1st Earl of Leicester. Stirling's parents married in 1853. Wilhelmina was the youngest child – she had three older siblings: the painter Evelyn Pickering de Morgan, Percival Spencer Umfreville Pickering (1858–1920) and Rowland Neville Umfreville (1861–1931). The painter John Roddam Spencer Stanhope was her maternal uncle. The Pickering siblings had a special relationship with their nanny which lasted until her death: Jane Hales was portrayed by Evelyn de Morgan as early as 1866, and later lived with Wilhelmina Stirling until her death in 1925, since she had never married herself.

Wilhelmina Pickering married Charles Goodbarne Stirling (1866–1948) in 1901 and they moved into Launceston Place. As a wedding present, the couple received a bowl with a leopard and deer motif from Wihelmina's brother-in-law, the ceramic artist and author William De Morgan, which is now on display in the De Morgan Museum.

Stirling was a humanist, and a Life Member of the Rationalist Press Association. She was described in The Humanist in 1963 as the RPA's 'oldest supporter'.

Wilhelmina Stirling died only 15 days before her 100th birthday in 1965 in Germany.

== Works ==
Stirling wrote her first novel as a child, The Adventures of Prince Almero: A Tale of the Wind-Spirit, for the entertainment of her cousins. After a revision it was later published in 1890. In honor of her father she wrote her first works under the male alias Percival Pickering. Stirling was only 25 years old at the time. Her novel A life Awry was published in 1893 and performed as a play in 1899. Her writing was not all fictional, a greater part of her publications dealt with the English landed gentry, her mother's ancestors, and artists she knew, including her sister Evelyn and brother-in-law William De Morgan. She is considered the author of more than 30 novels and historical reports. Her writings are a uniquely valuable if sometimes questionable source of biographical information.

== Art collection ==
In 1931, Wilhelmina and her husband Charles G. Stirling rented the building on the site of St. John's Estate in Battersea (now Battersea Village) and renamed it Old Battersea House. Since the couple saved the building from demolition, they received a lifelong lease for a nominal rent. Wilhelmina and Charles Stirling were both avid art and antique collectors, and in later years made a name for themselves for their entertaining tours of the Old Battersea House. Wilhelmina in particular documented the joint collection.

She made her art collection with works by her sister Evelyn De Morgan and her husband, William De Morgan, open to the public at Old Battersea House. Apart from their works she collected paintings by other Victorian era artists such as William Holman Hunt and John William Waterhouse and had a sizeable collection of furniture from the 16th and 17th centuries. After Wilhelmina Stirling's death, the Old Battersea House fell into disrepair. The collection is administered by the De Morgan Foundation in the De Morgan Museum in Barnsley.

Film director Ken Russell met her in 1961 and immortalized her at the age of 96 in the short film Old Battersea House for the BBC show Monitor. Stirling was considered one of the most eccentric residents of Battersea.

== Ghost hunting ==
In her later years, Stirling took interest in ghost hunting. She wrote the book Ghosts Vivisected (1957). A review in Western Folklore concluded that "the book is not terribly strong, and it falls short of presenting a convincing argument that will win over a skeptical reader".

== Publications ==
The published books of A.M.W. Stirling include:

- The Adventures of Prince Almero (1890, as A. M. D. Wilhelmina Pickering)
- Queen of the Goblins (1892, as A. M. D. Wilhelmina Pickering), illustrated by Olive J. Cockerell
- A Life Awry (1893, as "Percival" Pickering)
- A Pliable Marriage (1895, as "Percival" Pickering)
- The Spirit is Willing (1898, as "Percival" Pickering)
- Toy-Gods (1904, as "Percival" Pickering)
- Annals of a Yorkshire House, from the Papers of a Macaroni & His Kindred (1911)
- Coke of Norfolk and His Friends: The Life of Thomas William Coke, First Earl of Leicester of Holkham (1912)
- The Letter-Bag of Lady Elizabeth Spencer-Stanhope (1913)
- Macdonald of the Isles: A Romance of the Past and Present (1914)
- A Painter of Dreams, and Other Biographical Studies (1916)
- The Hothams; Being the Chronicles of the Hothams of Scorborough and South Dalton from Their Hitherto Unpublished Family Papers (1918)
- Pages & Portraits from the Past, Being the Private Papers of Sir William Hotham (1919)
- William De Morgan and His Wife (1922), called "biased, limited and sometimes erroneous" despite its "valuable insight"
- Life's Little Day: Some Tales and Other Reminiscences (1925)
- The Richmond Papers from the Correspondence and Manuscripts of George Richmond ... and His Son, Sir William Richmond (1926)
- Fyvie Castle: Its Lairds and Their Times (1928)
- The Ways of Yesterday; Being the Chronicles of the Way Family from 1307 to 1885 (1930)
- Life's Mosaic: Memories Canny and Uncanny (1934)
- Victorian Sidelights (1954)
- The Merry Wives of Battersea and Gossip of Three Centuries (1956)
- Ghosts Vivisected: An Impartial Inquiry into Their Manners, Habits, Mentality, Motives and Physical Construction (1957/58)
- A Scrapheap of Memories (1960)
