= Hogarth Club =

British artists' society

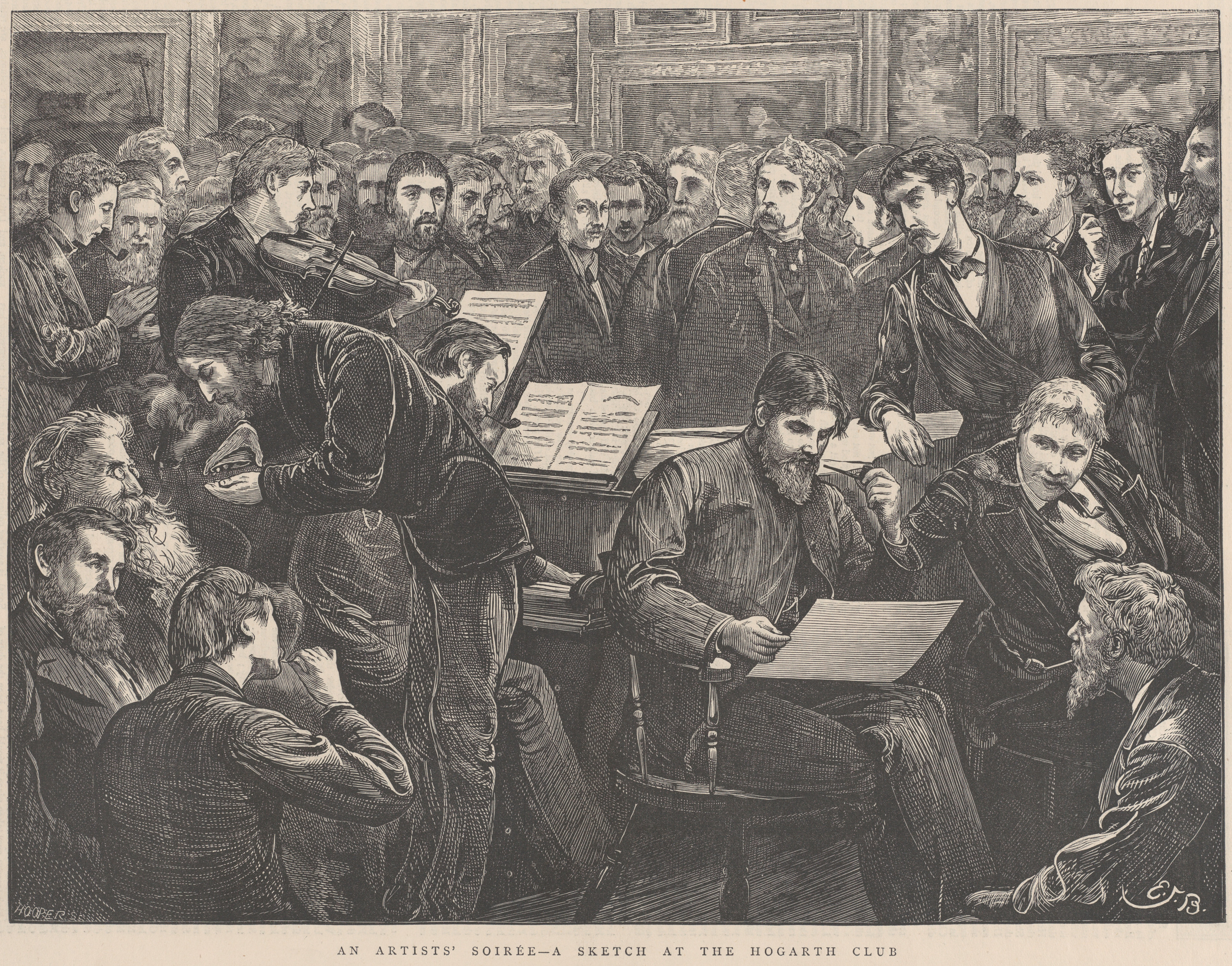
An Artists Soirée, a sketch at the Hogarth Club, from The Graphic, 1873

The Hogarth Club was an exhibition society of artists, based at 84 Charlotte Street, Fitzrovia, London, UK, which existed between 1858 and 1861. It was founded by former members of the Pre-Raphaelite Brotherhood after the original PRB had been dissolved. It was envisaged that the club would provide an alternative meeting space and exhibition venue to overcome prejudice against the Pre-Raphaelites at the Royal Academy. Unlike the PRB, the Hogarth Club was established on a professional basis, with two classes of members, artistic and non-artistic, and a distinction between London-based "resident" and provincial "non-resident" members.

Ford Madox Brown suggested that the club be named after William Hogarth since Hogarth was "a painter whom he deeply reverenced as the originator of moral invention and drama in modern art". Brown and Dante Gabriel Rossetti had worked on some previous independent exhibitions, but became determined to form a permanent exhibition space after the rejection of Pre-Raphaelite work by the Academy in 1857. In response they created their own exhibition, later founding the Hogarth Club in tandem with other sympathetic artists, most notably William Holman Hunt and John Roddam Spencer Stanhope.

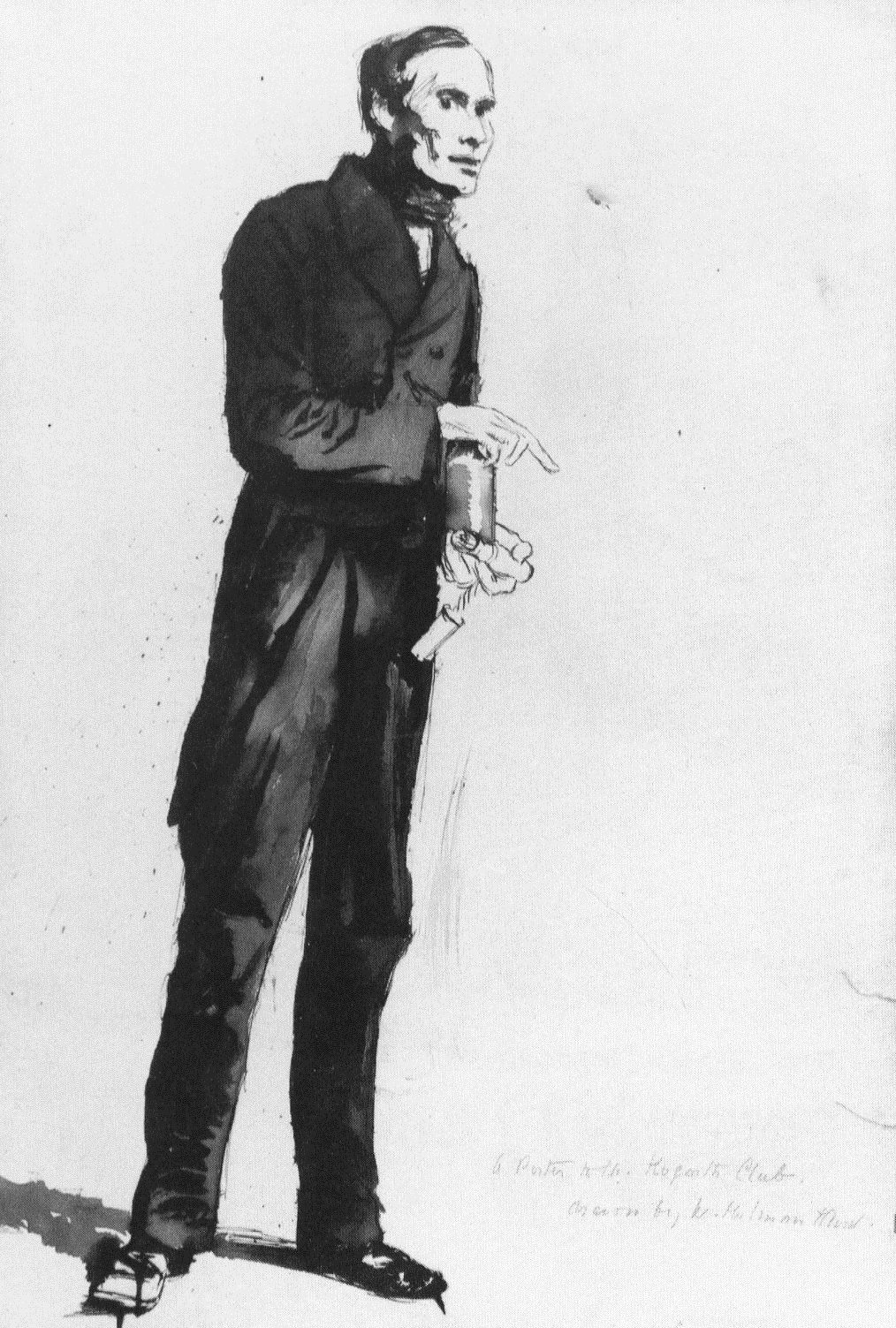
A porter at the club carrying a bottle of wine, drawing by Holman Hunt

Despite initial success, the Hogarth Club failed to maintain its momentum, and was finally closed in 1861 after failing to adequately build up its membership in the face of hostility from the Royal Academy. Even the former leading Pre-Raphaelite John Everett Millais refused to join, as did otherwise sympathetic Royal Academicians such as Augustus Egg.

== See also ==
- List of gentlemen's clubs in London
