= Percival Pickering =

English cricketer and Queen's Counsel lawyer

Personal information
- Full name: Percival Andree Pickering
- Born: 8 February 1810; London, England
- Died: 7 August 1876 (aged 66); Dover, Kent, England
- Batting: Unknown
- Relatives: Edward Pickering (brother); William Pickering (brother)

Career statistics
Competition	First-class
Matches	1
Runs scored	3
Batting average	1.50
100s/50s	–/–
Top score	3
Balls bowled	–
Wickets	–
Bowling average	–
5 wickets in innings	–
10 wickets in match	–
Best bowling	–
Catches/stumpings	–/–
- Source: Cricinfo, 2 October 2018

Percival Andree Pickering (8 February 1810 – 7 August 1876) was an English first-class cricketer and lawyer.

Pickering made a single appearance in first-class cricket in 1846 for the Surrey Club against the Marylebone Cricket Club at Lord's. He batted in both Surrey Club innings', being dismissed without scoring by William Hillyer in their first-innings, while in their second-innings he was dismissed by Jemmy Dean for 3 runs.

Pickering married Anne Maria Spencer-Stanhope. The couple had four children: the Pre-Raphaelite painter Evelyn De Morgan, chemist and horticulturist Percival Spencer Umfreville Pickering; Rowland Neville Umfreville (1861–1931) and the author Anna Pickering. He died at Dover in August 1876. His brother, William, was fundamental in the formation of Surrey County Cricket Club.
