= Cannon Hall =

Country house in South Yorkshire, England

Coordinates: 53.5709°N 1.5906°W

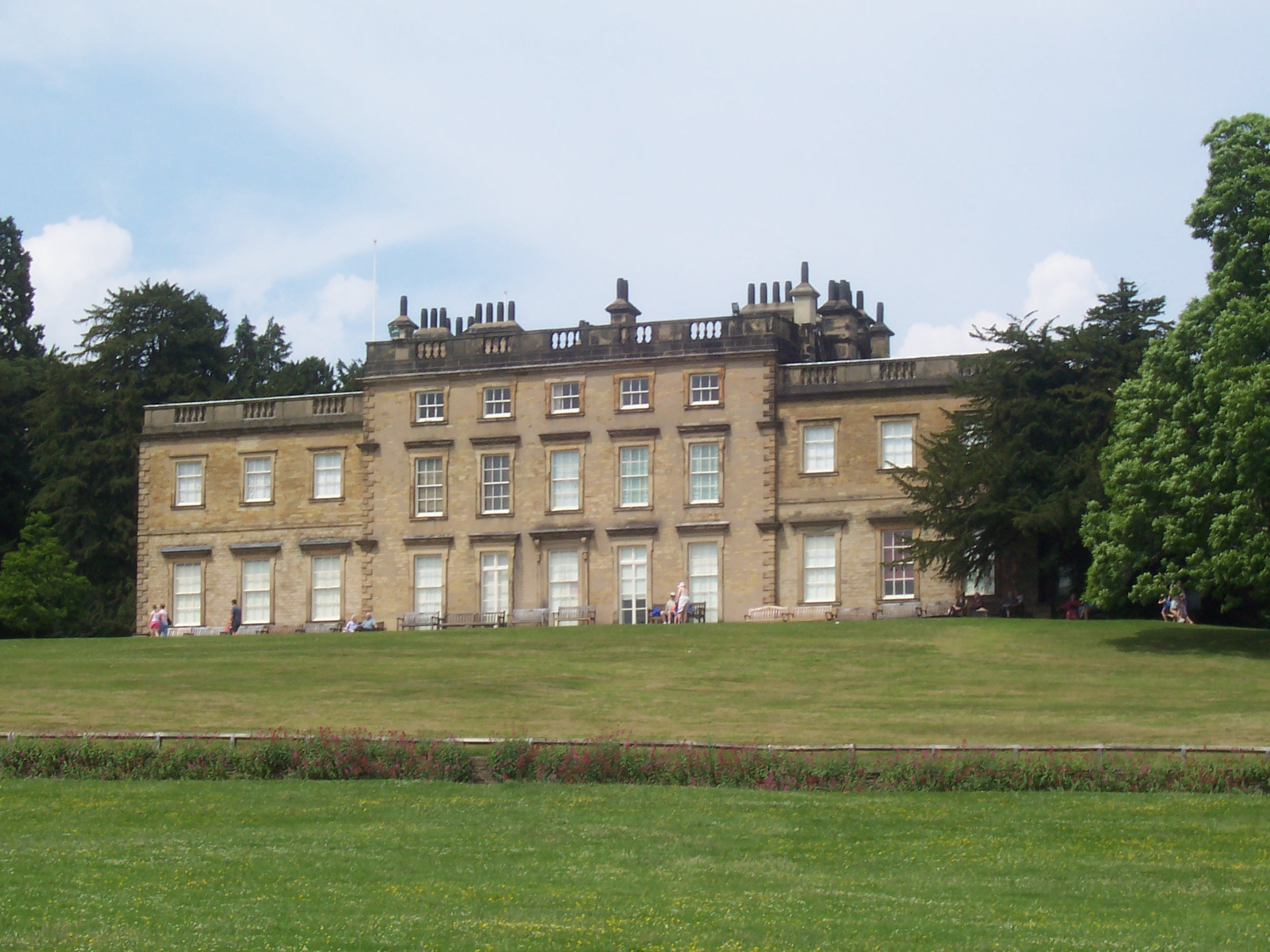
Cannon Hall Museum in the village of Cawthorne

Cannon Hall is a country house between the villages of Cawthorne and High Hoyland some 5 miles (8 km) west of Barnsley in South Yorkshire, England. Originally the home of the Spencer and subsequently the Spencer-Stanhope family, it houses collections of fine furniture, paintings, ceramics and glassware. The last of the Spencer Stanhopes sold the estate to Barnsley Corporation in 1951 and it opened as a museum in the late 1950s. It housed the Regimental Museum of the 13th/18th Royal Hussars (Queen Mary's Own) and the Light Dragoons, which has now closed. Now occupying four rooms in the east wing is the "Family of Artists" exhibition on loan from the De Morgan Foundation, which draws on the links between the Spencer Stanhopes and the De Morgans.

The building is constructed of coursed sandstone with ashlar dressings with a symmetrical layout of a central three-storey block of five bays and slightly set back two-storey side wings of three bays.

== History ==
Although there was a house on the site when the Domesday Survey of 1086 was conducted, Cannon Hall was named from the 13th-century inhabitant Gilbert Canun. By the late-14th century hall was in the ownership of the Bosville family of Ardsley, now a suburb in south-east of Barnsley. During this period the most violent event in Cannon Hall's history took place. The Bosvilles had let the hall to a family (whose name has been lost), the daughter of whom was romantically involved with a man named Lockwood who had been involved in the murder of Sir John Elland, the High Sheriff of Yorkshire. The tenant, afraid of the position in which he could find himself accommodating a fugitive, sent word to Bosville. Bosville's men arrived at Cannon Hall, where the fugitive was slain in a cruel and violent manner.

In 1660 the estate was purchased by John Spencer, a Welsh hay-rake maker. The Spencer family had arrived in Yorkshire from Montgomeryshire in the Welsh borders, a safer place than Wales for those with Royalist sympathies such as those of the Spencers. John Spencer was pardonned by Charles II when he was held in York prison on manslaughter charges. The Spencers became active in the local iron and coal industry - notably under John Spencer (died 1729) who took advantage of the death of his partners to establish control. The family built an empire and funded the rebuilding of Cannon Hall.

The core of the present hall was built at the opening of the 18th century for John Spencer Stanhope, possibly by John Etty of York, more surely with interior joinery by William Thornton, a local craftsman. It was enlarged with the addition of wings in 1764–67 by John Carr of York. Subsequently, the wings were heightened, giving the rather high-blocked mass seen today. The last member of the family, Elizabeth, sold the house to Barnsley Council in 1951.

Cannon Hall Museum opened to the public in 1957.

== Museum ==
Cannon Hall Museum, park and gardens is owned and operated by Barnsley Metropolitan Borough Council. The Hall has a programme of events, including the annual Regency Ball, a Christmas Fair each December and guided tours, workshops and children's activities throughout the year.

=== Gardens and historic plant collection ===
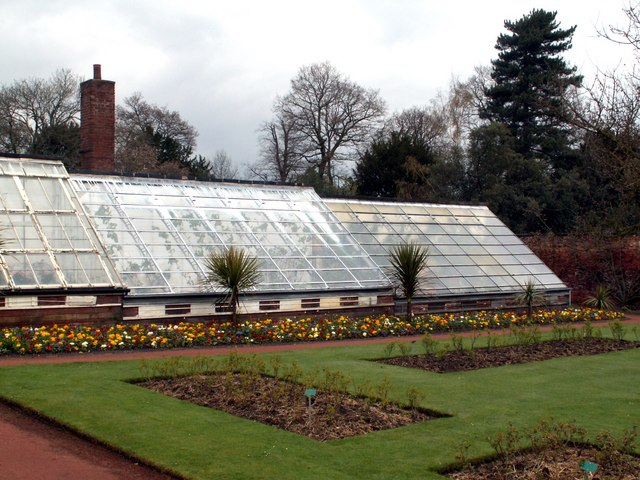
The Walled Garden Greenhouses at Cannon Hall

The parkland surrounding the hall was landscaped in the 18th century by Richard Woods of Chertsey, and features acres of parkland, lakes, waterfalls, follies and vistas. The Victorian pleasure grounds are located close to the Georgian walled garden, which houses a collection of over forty varieties of pear trees, among other plants.

The central glasshouses rebuilt in the Victorian era house the original Cannon Hall Muscat grapevine. Reputedly grown from a seed brought back from Greece by John Spencer Stanhope, the large white table grape has been cultivated extensively in California and Western Australia (local spelling, Canon Hall Muscat) and has acted as rootstock for a number of premium hybrid cultivars including the Japanese Pione grape.

=== De Morgan Foundation ===
In March 2016, Cannon Hall Museum and the De Morgan Foundation, a registered charity preserving the work of William De Morgan and Evelyn De Morgan, entered into a collaboration which saw the opening of the "Family of Artists" long-term exhibition in the east wing of the Museum.

== See also ==
- Grade II* listed buildings in South Yorkshire
- Listed buildings in Cawthorne
- Cannon Hall Farm

== References and sources ==
Sources

- Howard Colvin, A Biographical Dictionary of British Architects, 1600–1840
- History of Cawthorne, by Rev. Charles Tiplady Pratt (1882)
