= Percival Spencer Umfreville Pickering =

British chemist and horticulturist

Portrait by Walter Stoneman, 1917

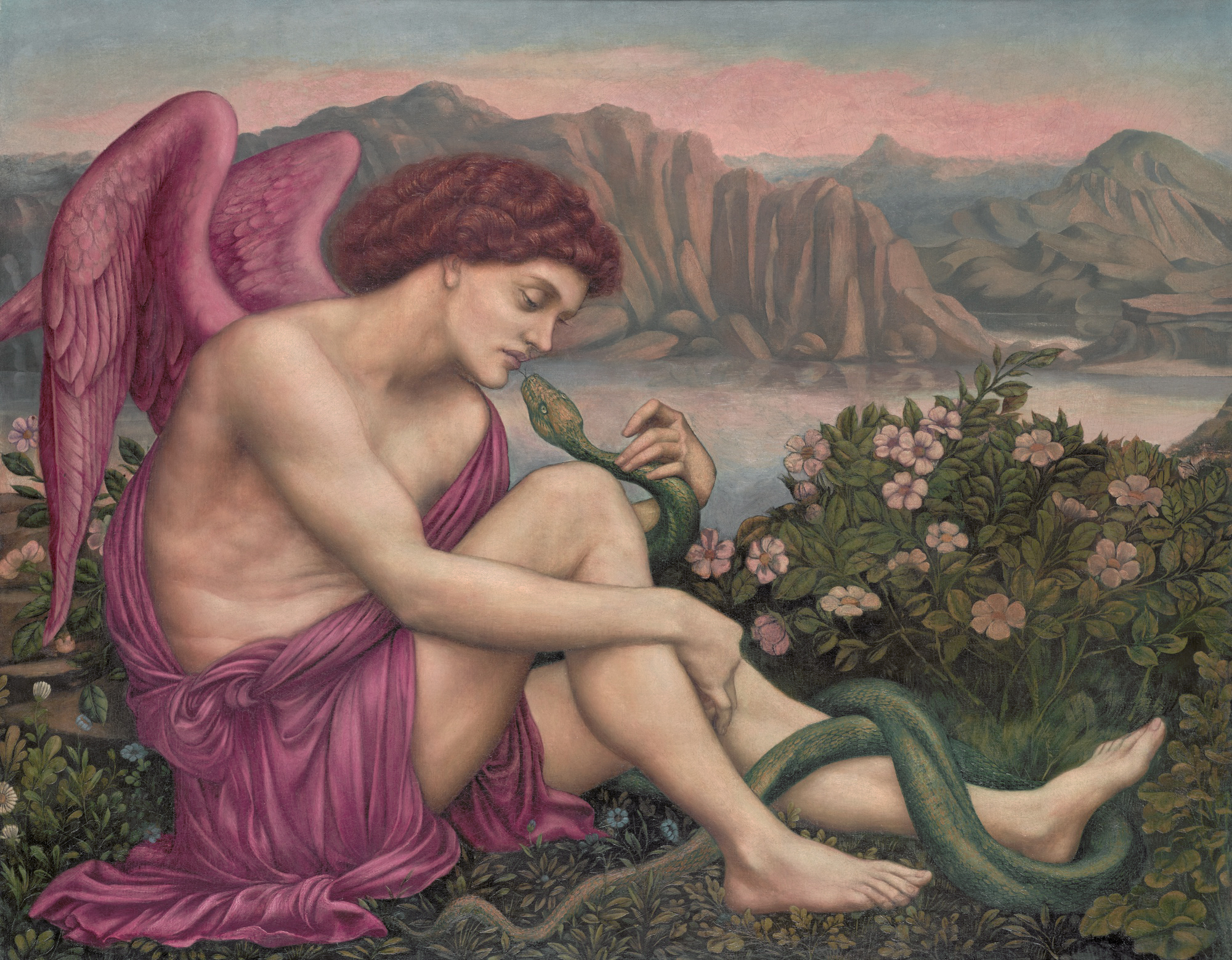
The angel with the serpent. Percival Spencer Umfreville Pickering was the model for this painting by his sister Evelyn De Morgan, c. 1870s.

Percival Spencer Umfreville Pickering (6 March 1858 – 5 December 1920) was a British chemist and horticulturist.

== Early life and education ==
Born to Anne Maria Spencer-Stanhope, granddaughter of Thomas Coke, 1st Earl of Leicester and her husband Percival Pickering, he was the second eldest of four children. His elder sister was the artist Evelyn de Morgan and he was followed by Rowland Neville Umfreville (1861–1931) and writer Wilhelmina, later known as A. M. W. Stirling (1865-1965). His maternal uncle was the artist John Roddam Spencer Stanhope.

Pickering grew up in a wealthy family, was educated at Eton College and studied sciences at Balliol College, Oxford, graduating with a first class degree in 1881. He was able to start a career in science by building his own laboratory in his private house.

== Career ==
In 1881, he took up a position as lecturer at Bedford College, where he stayed until 1887. After losing an eye in a serious accident in his lab, his health waned and he moved to the countryside to the village of Harpenden. Among the residents of the village were already four fellows of the Royal Society, and Pickering was to become the fifth by 1890.

From 1894 on, he was director of the Woburn Experimental Fruit Farm, a private establishment by Pickering and the Duke of Bedford, where he worked to improve horticultural techniques.

In 1907, he discovered the phenomenon that emulsions can be stabilised by small particles instead of emulsifiers, nowadays referred to as Pickering stabilization, although the effect was already recognised by Walter Ramsden in 1903.
