= Edward Pickering (cricketer) =

English cleric, schoolmaster, and cricketer

Edward Hayes Pickering (21 May 1807 – 19 May 1852) was an English cricketer with amateur status. He was associated with several clubs and made his debut in 1827. He was educated at Eton and Trinity College, Cambridge. After graduating he was a fellow of St John's College, Cambridge, 1830–33. He was ordained as a Church of England priest and was an assistant master at Eton College from 1830 until his death.

== Bibliography ==
- Haygarth, Arthur (1996) [1862]. Scores & Biographies, Volume 1 (1744–1826). Kennington: Frederick Lillywhite. ISBN 978-19-00592-23-9.
- Haygarth, Arthur (1997) [1862]. Scores & Biographies, Volume 2 (1827–1840). Kennington: Frederick Lillywhite. ISBN 978-19-00592-23-9.
