= Cawthorne =

Village and civil parish in South Yorkshire, England

Coordinates: 53.5674°N 1.5719°W

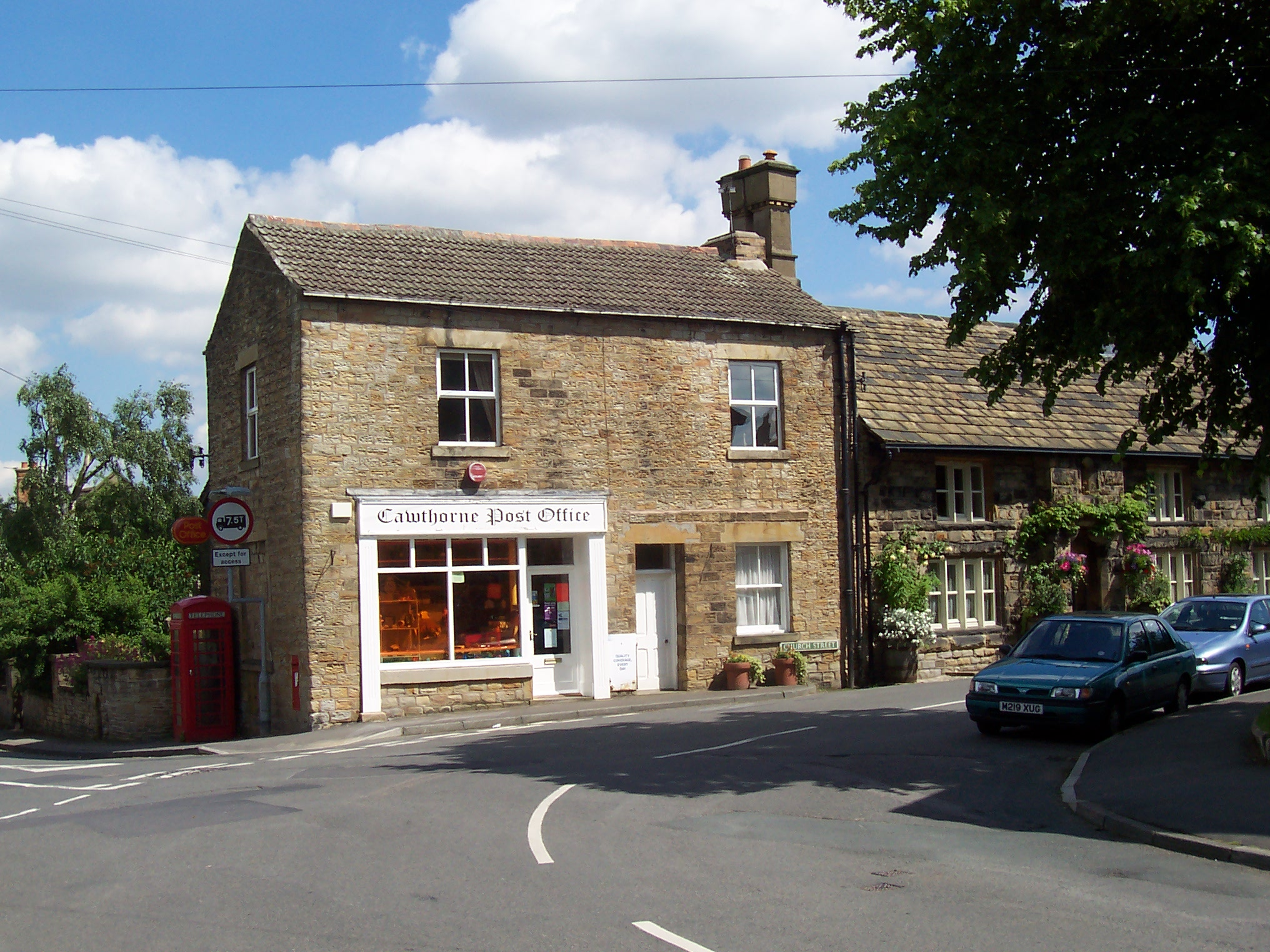
- The post office in Cawthorne

- Location within South Yorkshire
- Population: 1,151 (2011 census)
- OS grid reference: SE284079
  - London: 150 miles (240 km)
- Civil parish: Cawthorne
- Metropolitan borough: Barnsley
- Metropolitan county: South Yorkshire
- Region: Yorkshire and the Humber
- Country: England
- Sovereign state: United Kingdom
- Post town: BARNSLEY
- Postcode district: S75
- Dialling code: 01226
- Police: South Yorkshire
- Fire: South Yorkshire
- Ambulance: Yorkshire
- UK Parliament: Penistone and Stocksbridge

Cawthorne is a village and civil parish in the Metropolitan Borough of Barnsley, South Yorkshire, England. The village was once a centre of the iron and coal mining industry; today it is part of an affluent commuter belt west of Barnsley. At the 2001 census it had a population of 1,108, increasing to 1,151 at the 2011 Census.

The name Cawthorne derives from the Old English caldþorn meaning 'cold thorn'.

The village pub, the Spencer Arms, is named after the Spencer-Stanhope family, who once owned large swathes of the local area. Their home was Cannon Hall, the park of which borders the village.

Two earlier residences in Cawthorne were Barnby Hall, home of the Barnby family, and Banks Hall, the seat of the Misses Spencer-Stanhope and of a branch of the Greene family.

In 1940, Cannon Hall Park was requisitioned by the military, to house British, Polish and Canadian troops for the duration of World War II. The military camp was immediately adjacent to the village and its presence, with up to 1,000 troops, had an impact upon residents. In 1946 the camp was used by the Polish Resettlement Corps, a unit established to help Polish citizens who could not return to Poland, to settle in Britain. This continued until 1952.

Cawthorne is frequented by ramblers as many walking routes start from the village.

The Victoria Jubilee Museum, built to commemorate Queen Victoria's Golden Jubilee, was opened in 1889 and contains numerous unusual exhibits including a stuffed cheetah and a two-headed lamb.

All Saints' Church overlooks the village, and there is a Methodist church on Darton Road. All Saints contains memorials to the Barnby and Spencer families.

In the heart of the village stands Malt Kiln Row, originally the malt kiln for Cannon Hall.

Kate Rusby, English folk singer-songwriter, lives in the village with her husband and two children.

== Freedom of the Parish ==
The following people have received the Freedom of the Parish of Cawthorne.

=== Individuals ===
- Eric Ellis 2010.
- Robert Barr: 18 August 2023.

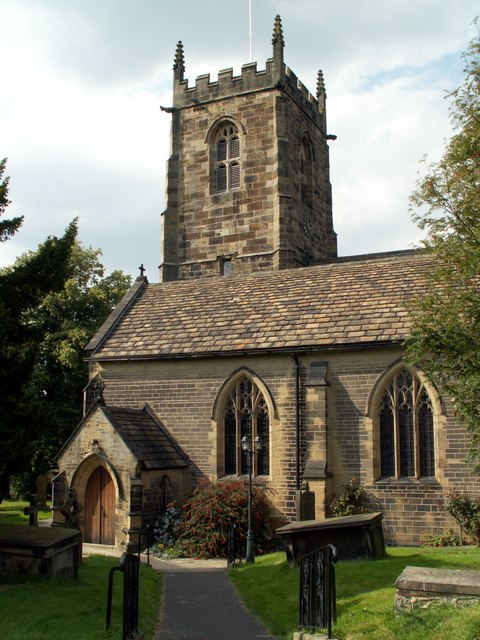
All Saints' Church, Cawthorne

== See also ==
- Listed buildings in Cawthorne
