= Emma Sandys =

British painter (1841–1877)

- Born: Mary Ann Emma Sands; 25 September 1841; Norwich, England, United Kingdom of Great Britain and Ireland
- Died: 21 November 1877 (aged 36); Norwich, England, United Kingdom of Great Britain and Ireland
- Known for: Painting
- Movement: Pre-Raphaelites
- Relatives: Frederick Sandys (brother)

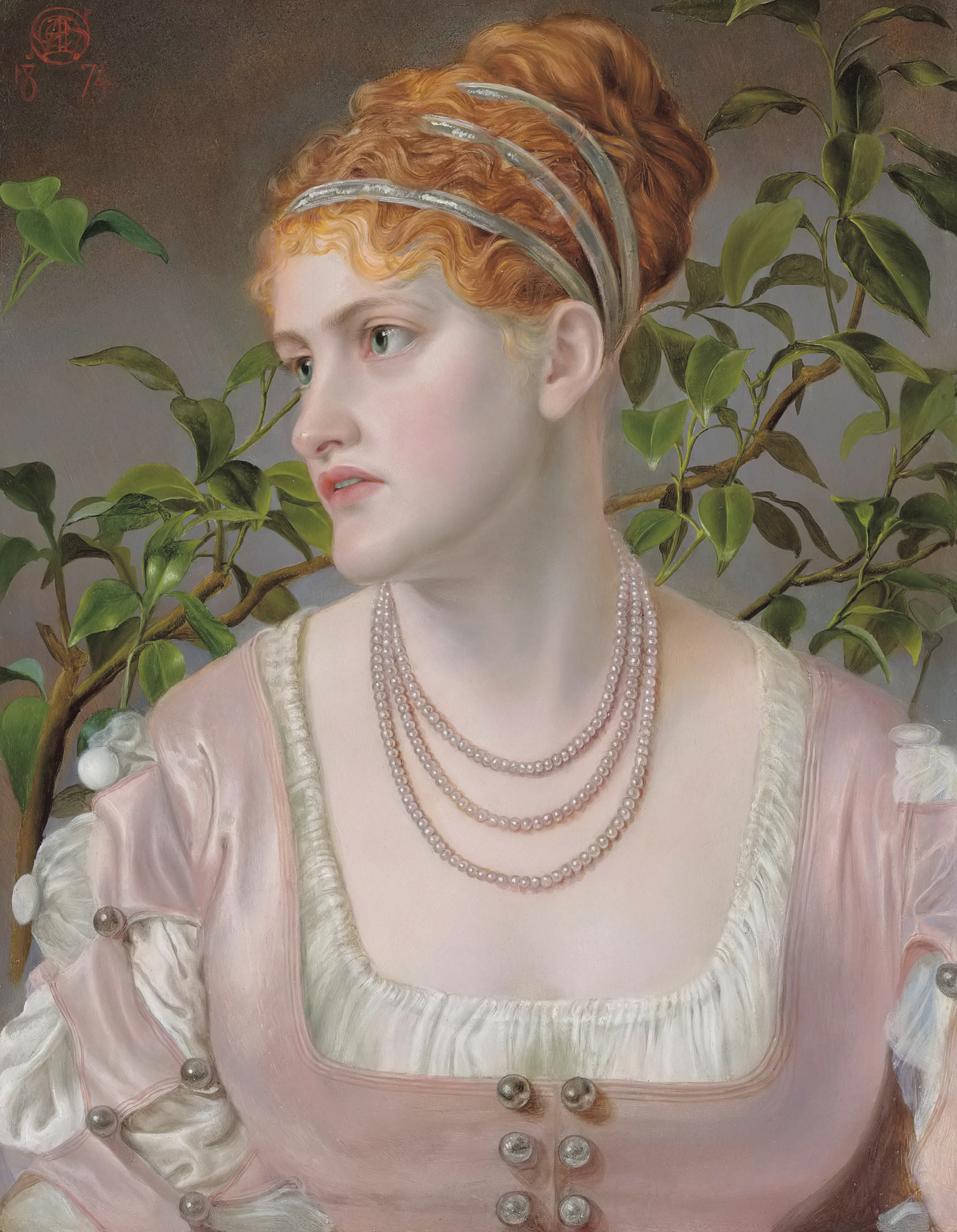
Mary Emma Jones by Emma Sandys, 1874

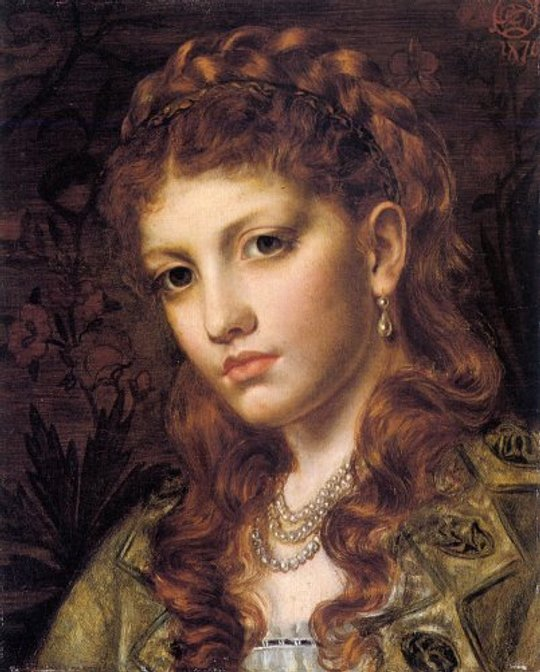
Fiammetta by Emma Sandys, 1876

Emma Sandys (born Mary Ann Emma Sands) (25 September 1841 – 21 November 1877) was a British Pre-Raphaelite painter. Like many female artists of her era, Sandys’ contributions to art history were largely overlooked until the late 20th century, when her paintings were re-examined by feminist art scholars.

== Biography ==
Emma Sandys was born in Norwich, where her father, Anthony Sands (1806–1883), gave her some early art lessons. In 1853 the family added a 'y' to their surname. She was influenced by her brother Frederick Sandys (1829–1904), one of the Pre-Raphaelite Brotherhood, and his friend Dante Gabriel Rossetti. Sandys did not start painting until adulthood, her earliest painting is dated to 1863. Records show that she exhibited her work in both London and Norwich between 1867 and 1874. Emma Sandys debuted at the Norwich and Eastern Counties Working Classes Industrial Exhibition in 1867 with her oil painting “Preparing for the Ball”. This painting was later included in the 1997-98 exhibition Pre-Raphaelite Women Artists in Manchester before eventually being sold at auction in 2003. This exhibition was designed by Jan Marsh and Pamela Gerrish Nunn to showcase the overlooked contributions of women artists in the Pre-Raphaelite movement. Emma Sandys’ artwork has frequently been falsely attributed to her elder brother Frederick Sandys, which has made it hard for art historians to properly credit her work. Her works were mainly portraits in both oil and chalk of children and of young women, often in period clothing, against backgrounds of brightly coloured flowers. Sandys created most of her work around Norwich, but may have spent time in the studio of her brother, Frederick Sandys, in London. She died from congestion of the lungs in Norwich on 21 November 1877.

Portrait of Emma Sandys, painted by her brother Frederick in 1855.

Her works include:

- Elaine (National Trust Collection, Wightwick Manor, Wolverhampton.)
- Fiammetta
- Lady in Yellow Dress (Norwich Castle Museum.)
- Viola (Walker Art Gallery, Liverpool.)
- La belle jaune giroflée (The Beautiful Wallflower) (KINCM:2005.6134, Ferens Art Gallery)

== Gallery ==
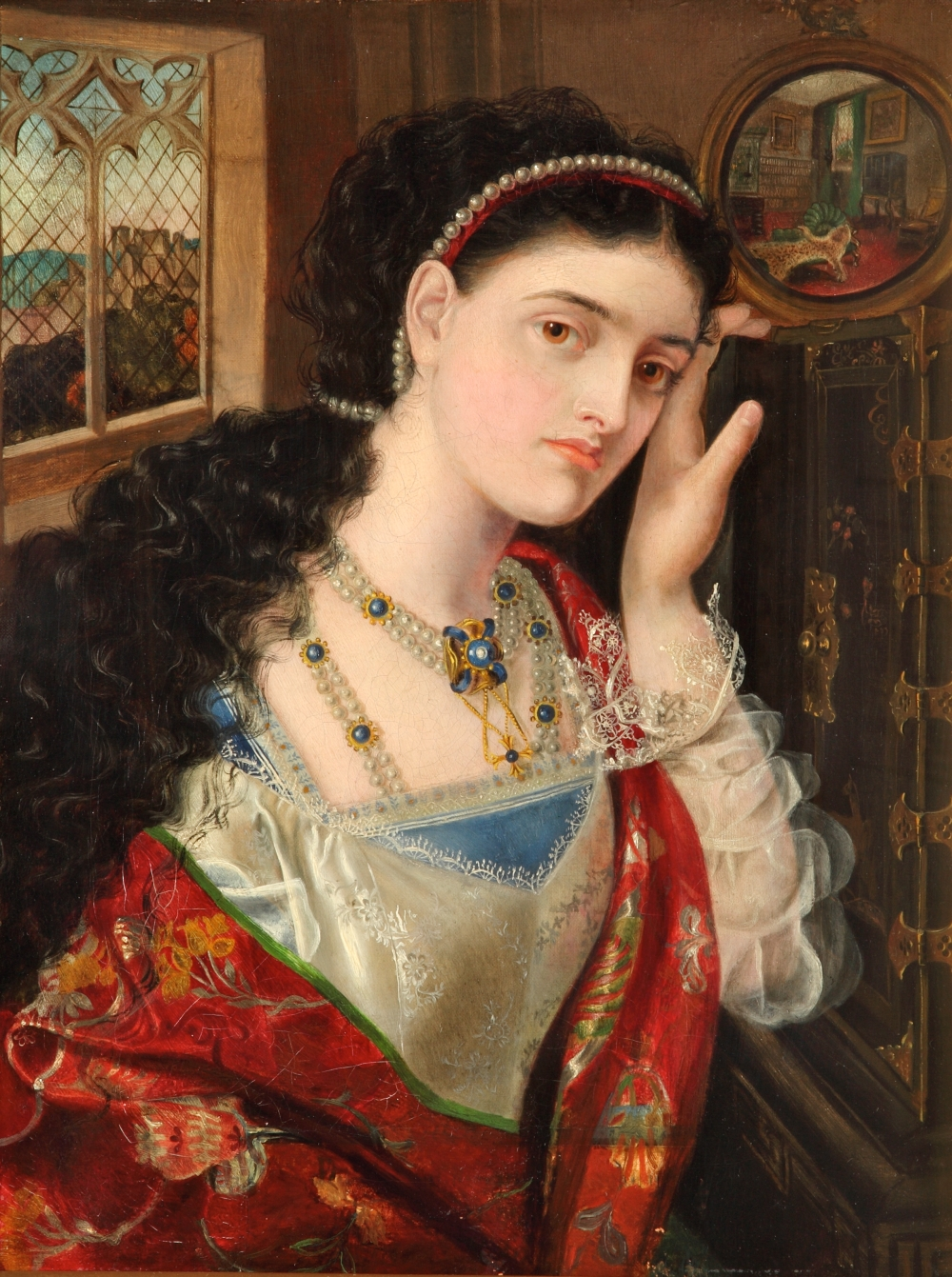
Viola, circa 1865

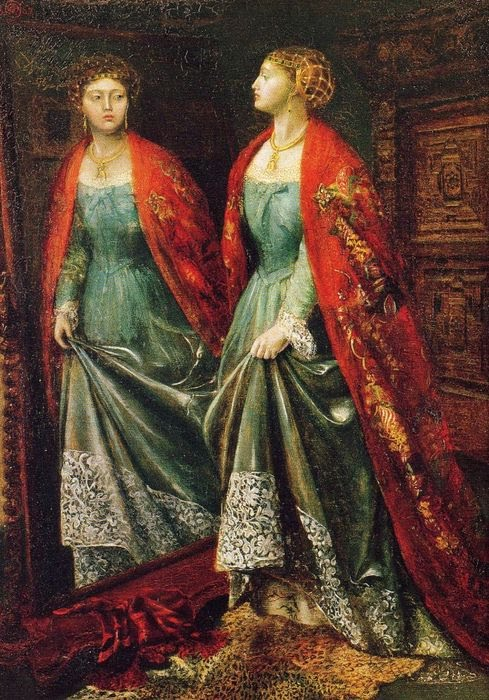
Preparing for the Ball, 1867

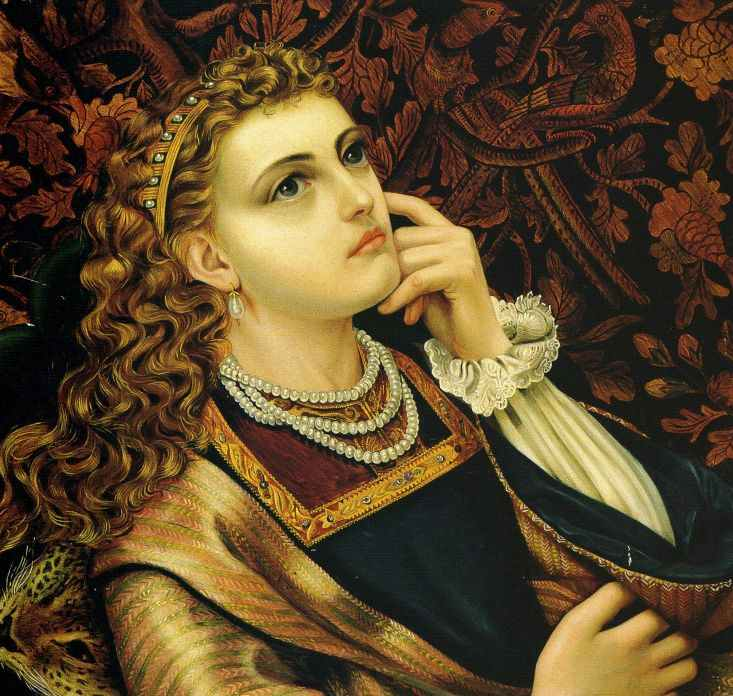
Elaine, Wightwick Manor

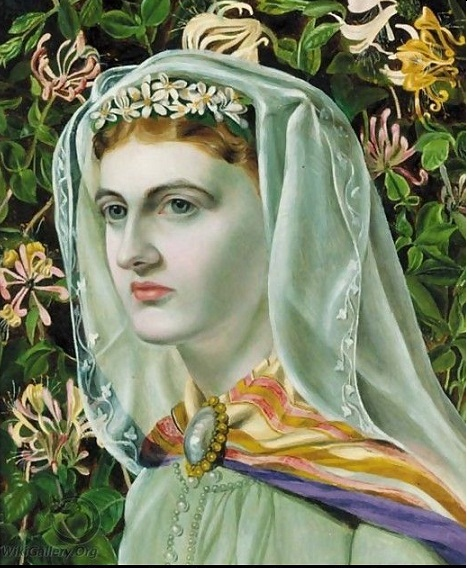
A Medieval Beauty, circa 1875

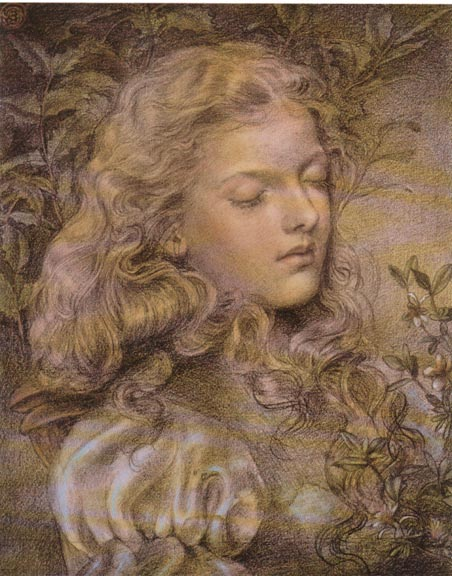
Portrait of a Girl, circa 1865
