= Morgan le Fay (painting) =

Painting by Frederick Sandys

- Artist: Frederick Sandys
- Year: 1864
- Medium: oil on canvas
- Dimensions: 61.8 cm × 43.7 cm (24.3 in × 17.2 in)
- Location: Birmingham Museums Trust, Birmingham, England

Morgan le Fay is an 1864 oil-on-wood painting by British Pre-Raphaelite painter Frederick Sandys which portrays the legendary witch and King Arthur's sister, Morgan le Fay. Keomi Gray, Sandys's mistress was the model for Morgan le Fay.

The work was displayed at the Royal Academy Exhibition of 1864 at the National Gallery in London. The painting is held at the Birmingham Museum and Art Gallery in Birmingham, England. The museum described it as following: "Here she stands in front of a loom on which she has woven an enchanted robe, designed to consume the body of King Arthur by fire. Her appearance with her loose hair, abandoned gestures and draped leopard skin suggests a dangerous and bestial female sexuality. The green robe that Morgan is depicted wearing is actually a kimono."
