= Frederick Sandys =

English Pre-Raphaelite painter (1829–1904)

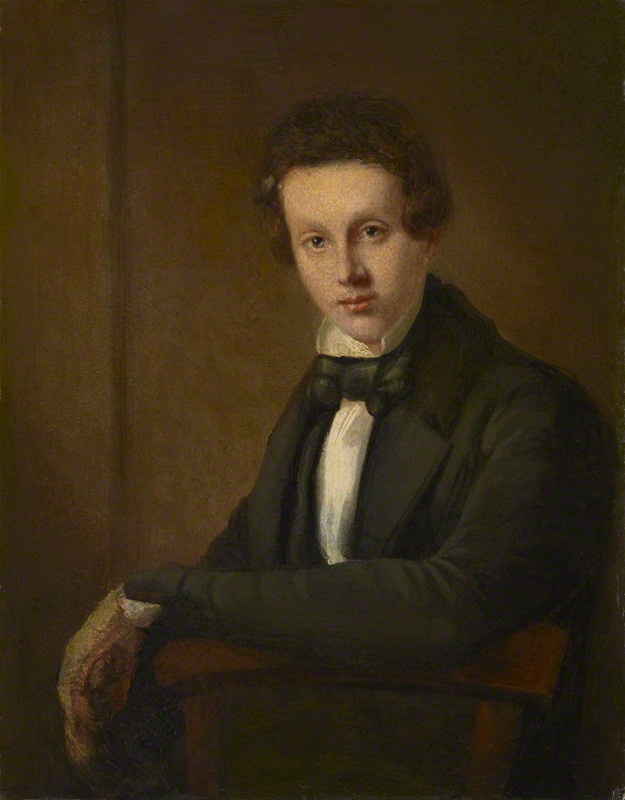
- Portrait of Frederick Sandys by his father Anthony Sand (1848)
- Born: 1 May 1829; Norwich, England
- Died: 25 June 1904 (aged 75); Kensington, London, England
- Education: John Crome
- Known for: Landscape painting
- Movement: Norwich School of Design; Norwich School of painters
- Relatives: Emma Sandys (sister)

Anthony Frederick Augustus Sandys (born Antonio Frederic Augustus Sands), 1 May 1829 – 25 June 1904, usually known as Frederick Sandys, was a British painter, illustrator, and draughtsman, associated with the Pre-Raphaelites. He was also associated with the Norwich School of painters.

== Biography ==
=== Artistic studies ===
Frederick Sandys was born on 1 May 1829 in Norwich, and received his earliest lessons in art from his father, Anthony Sands, who was himself a painter. His early studies show that he had a natural gift for careful and beautiful drawing. He was educated at Norwich School and later attended the Norwich School of Design in 1846. In the same and next year his talent was recognized by the Royal Society of Arts.

=== Personal relationships ===
Sandys married Georgiana Creed, but this marriage only lasted three years, although they never divorced. He had a long affair with the Romany woman Keomi Gray, who sat as a model both for him and Dante Gabriel Rossetti (The Beloved, 1865-66), and perhaps also for Simeon Solomon. He and Gray had two daughters and two sons.

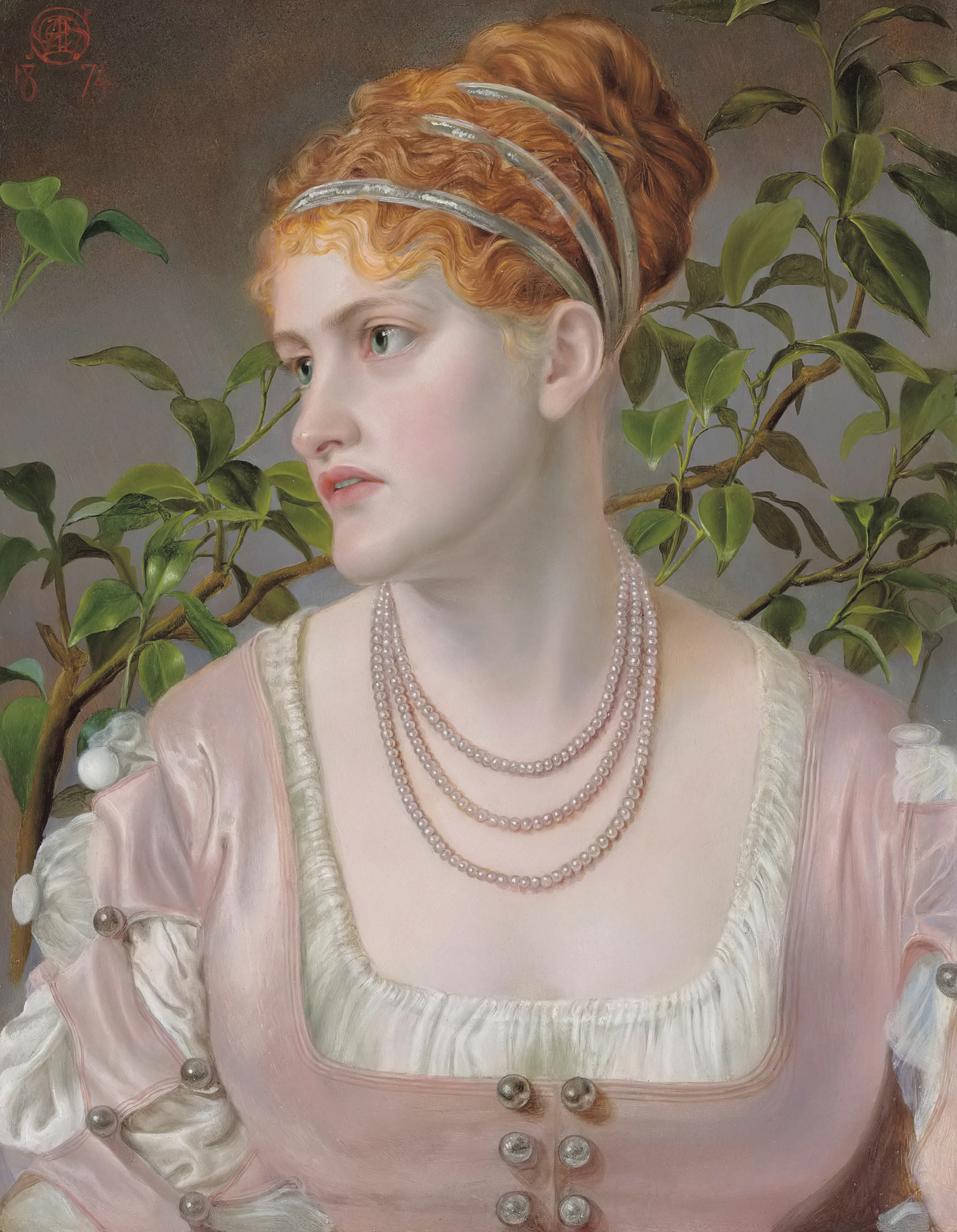
Mary Emma Jones, by Emma Sandys, 1874

In 1862 Sandys met actress Mary Emma Jones, known as Miss Clive, when she modeled for The Magdalen, now owned by the Norwich Castle Museum. A relationship developed between the two; he became devoted to her, taking her as his common-law wife for the rest of his life. She gave birth to a large number of children, 10 of whom were raised under the name of Neville and survived after Sandys's death. She appears in paintings such as Sandys's Love's Shadow and his 1867 work Proud Maisie, which was inspired by Mary--so much so that he made at least 11 versions by 1904.

Sandys influenced his younger sister, Emma Sandys (1841–1877), whose works were mainly portraits of children and of young women, often in period or medieval clothing.

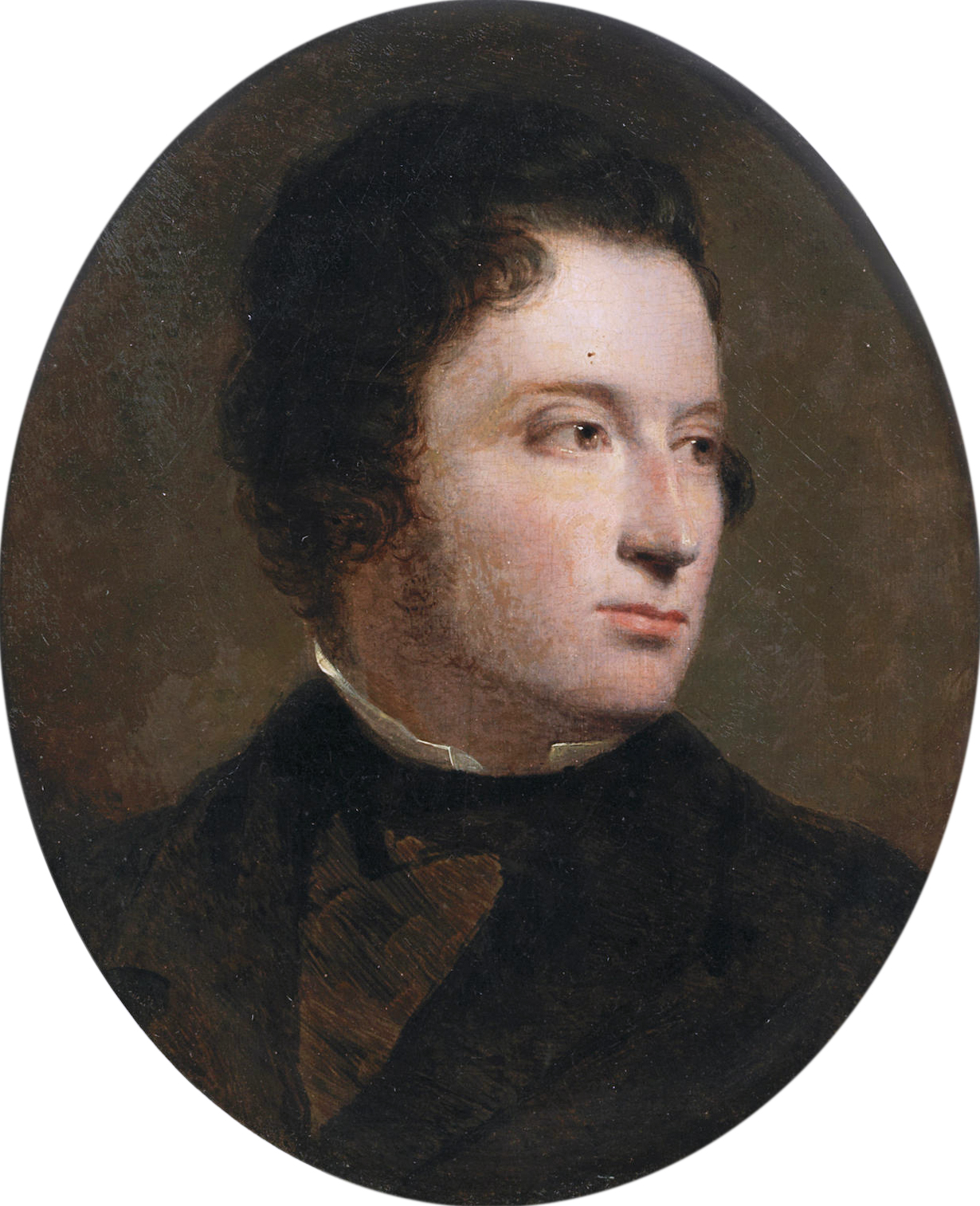
Portrait of Anthony Sands by his son Frederick Sandys, 1849

He died in Kensington in west London on 25 June 1904.

== Works ==
=== Early work ===
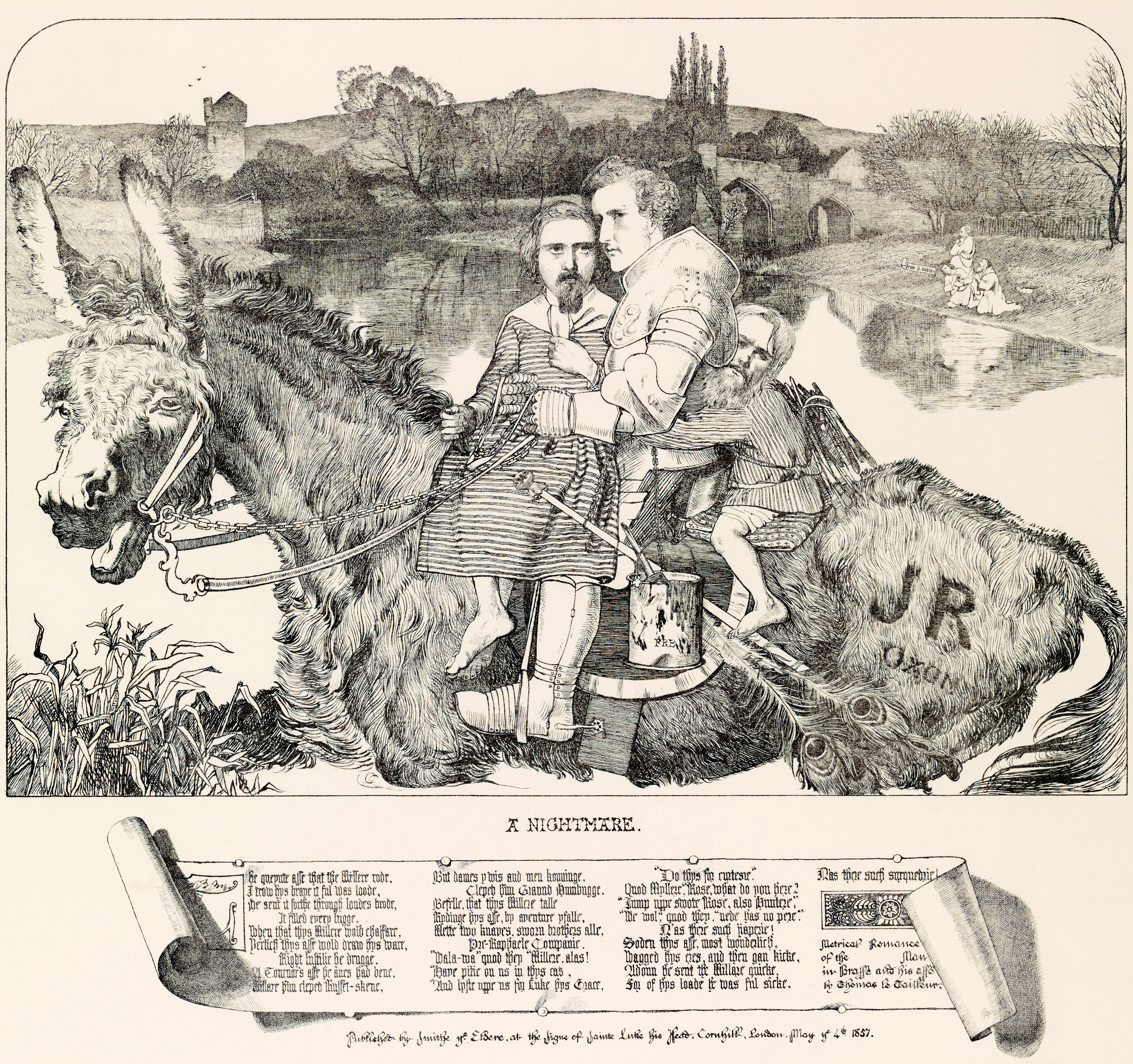
The Nightmare, 1857

Sandys displayed great skills as a draughtsman, achieving recognition with his print The Nightmare (1857), parodying John Everett Millais's Sir Isumbras at the Ford. The caricaturist turned the horse of Sir Isumbras into a laughing donkey labelled "J. R., Oxon.", understood as a reference to John Ruskin. Upon the donkey was seated Millais himself, in the character of the knight, with Rossetti and Holman Hunt replacing the two children, one before and one behind. The caricature, produced using the new autographic lithographic process, caused a lot of talk about who the artist might be and ultimately introduced Sandys to the London art community.

Rossetti and Sandys became close friends, and from May 1866 to July 1867, Sandys lived with Rossetti at 16, Cheyne Walk, Chelsea. Sandys's works were profoundly influenced by those of Rossetti. He focused mainly on mythological subjects and portraits.

=== Drawings and illustration ===
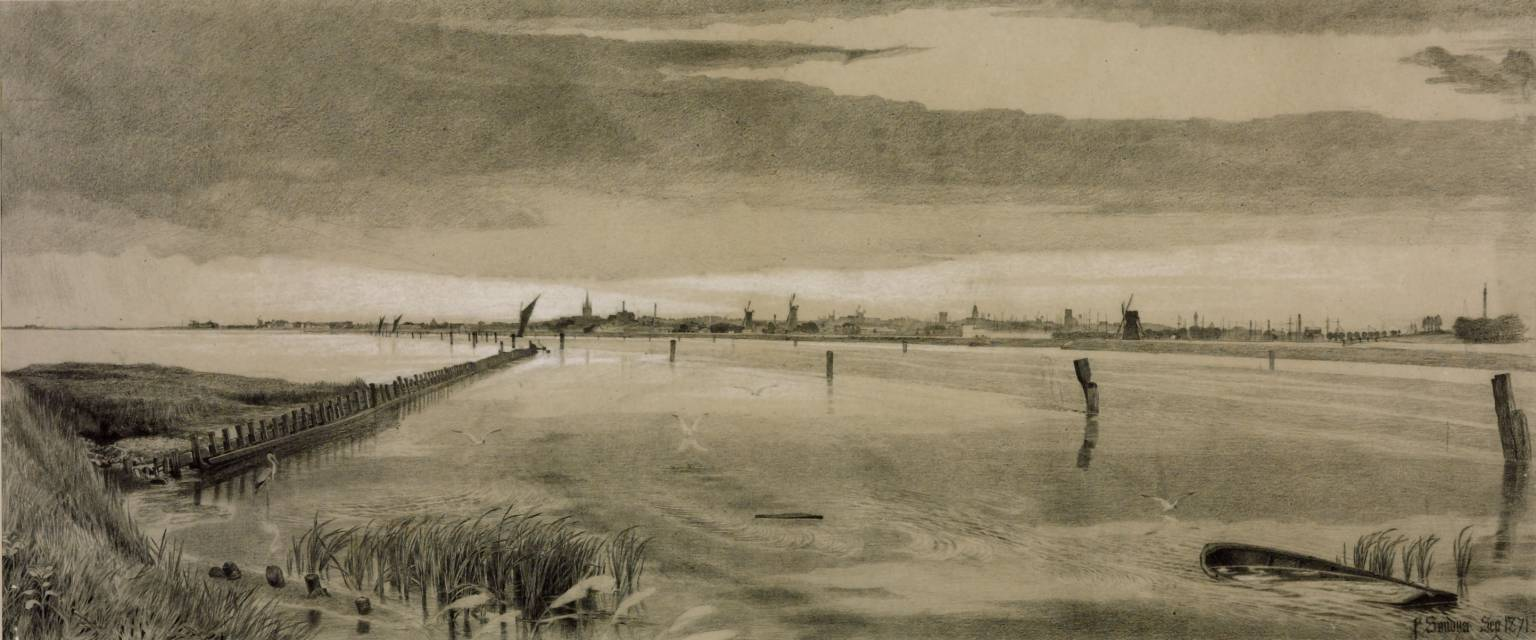
Great Yarmouth and Breydon Water (1871), Tate Britain

Wood-engravings
Some of the first introductions to Pre-Raphaelite teachings emerged in magazines, such as Once a Week, the Cornhill Magazine, Good Words and Sunday Magazine. Sandys began drawing in the 1860s for Once a Week, the Cornhill Magazine, Good Words and other periodicals, his work influenced by Albrecht Dürer, Ambrosius Holbein, and Alfred Rethel. Sandys made a total of 26 between 1859 and 1866, but each was a fine representation of this genre, faithfully engraved by professional wood-engravers, including the Dalziel brothers and Joseph Swain, and they are worthy of the collector's portfolio. For the engravers to be successful in carving the intricate illustrations onto wood, they needed to start with a detailed, clear design from the artist. Sandys had an eye and talent for exacting detail, an intention to accurately reflect the subject, revealed in the quality of his works, equally impressive for its technical detail as for its imaginative point of view.

Sandys's The Death of King Warwulf is an example of his ability to create drawings that translated well for the engravings. Swirling shapes of flames, the curve of the boat, its sail and the king's clothes that surround him create a feeling of movement. The focal point is the king's bowed head.

His last woodcut was on the subject of Danaë in the Brazen Chamber. It was engraved by Swain for Once A Week but suppressed by the publication's editor, despite Sandys having the support of the magazine's publishers, on the grounds that it was too sensuous.

He worked exclusively for magazines, and no books illustrated by him have been documented. His drawings can be found in bound periodical volumes, as well as in publications such as Dalziel’s Bible Gallery and the Cornhill Gallery, and in illustrated books that were intended for display in drawing rooms.

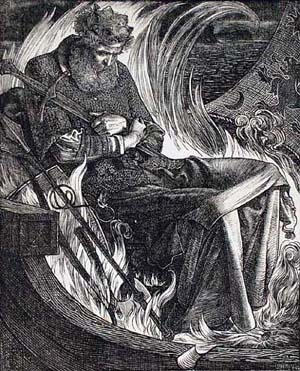
The Death of King Warwulf, 1862

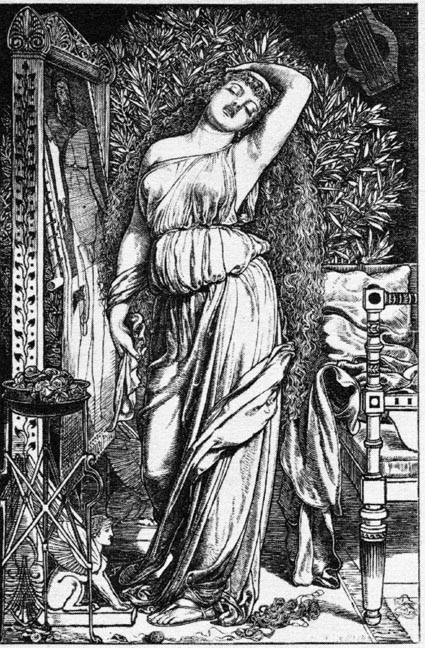
Danaë in the Brazen Chamber, wood-engraving, signed by Swain, Museum of Fine Arts, Boston

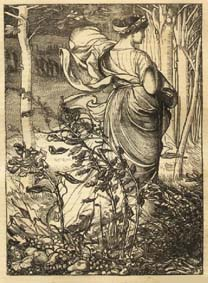
The Advent of Winter

Chalk drawings of lettered men
He made a number of chalk drawings of famous men of letters, including Tennyson, Browning, Matthew Arnold, and James Russell Lowell.

Studies for paintings
Study for Vivien depicts Sandys's lover, Keomi Gray, as Vivien of Tennyson's poem Idylls of the King. In the poem Vivien is the femme fatale in the story of King Arthur who used her looks to seduce Merlin to learn his secrets. Sandys had previously used tales from King Arthur as inspiration for his work, such as King Pelles' Daughter. He was drawn to stories of women who "seduce, entrap and destroy men, such as Helen of Troy, Morgan Le Fay and Medea." Sandys portrays Vivien as a beautiful, self-assured woman. The apple placed in front of her may refer to the story of Adam and Eve.

Study for Autumn, made in 1860, is one of the many studies Sandys made before painting Autumn and provides evidence of Sandys's skill as a draughtsman. He captures minute details, such as the soldier's uniform and the plants and flowers. The study is much like the finished painting, except that the ginger jar is in the foreground.

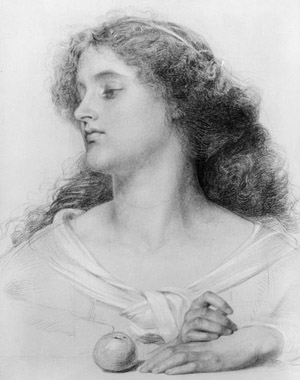
Study for Vivien, black and red chalk, Norwich Castle Museum and Art Gallery

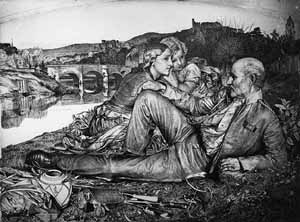
Study for Autumn, 1860, Norwich Castle Museum and Art Gallery

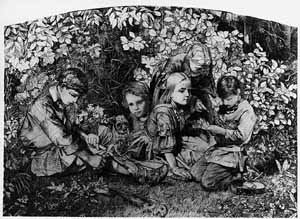
Study for Spring, 1860, Norwich Castle Museum and Art Gallery

=== Paintings ===
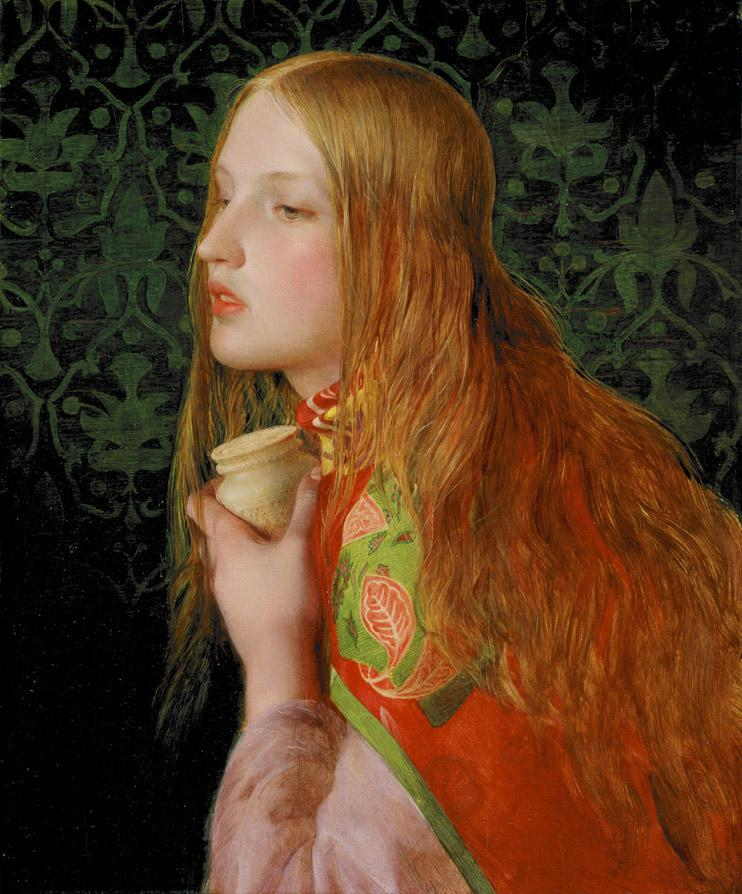
Mary Magdalene, c. 1859, Delaware Art Museum

Early in the 1860s he began to exhibit the paintings which set the seal upon his fame. The best known of these are Vivien (1863), Morgan le Fay (1864), Cassandra and Medea (1868).

Sandys never became a popular painter. He painted little, and the dominant influence upon his art was the influence exercised by lofty conceptions of tragic power. There was in it a sombre intensity and an almost stern beauty which lifted it far above the ideals of the crowd. The Scandinavian Sagas and Le Morte d'Arthur gave him subjects after his own heart, and The Valkyrie and Morgan le Fay represent some of his best work.

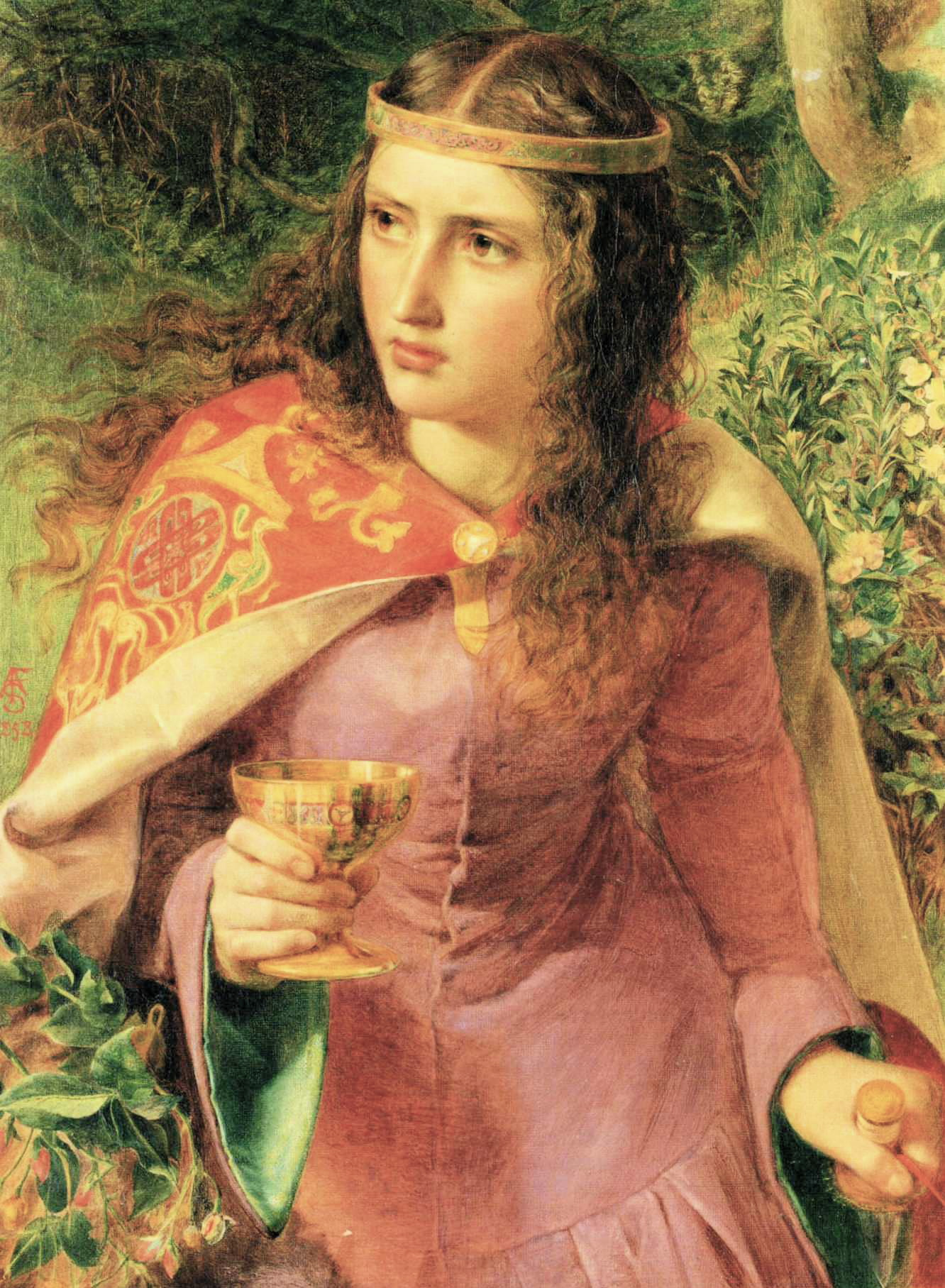
Queen Eleanor, 1858, National Museum Cardiff

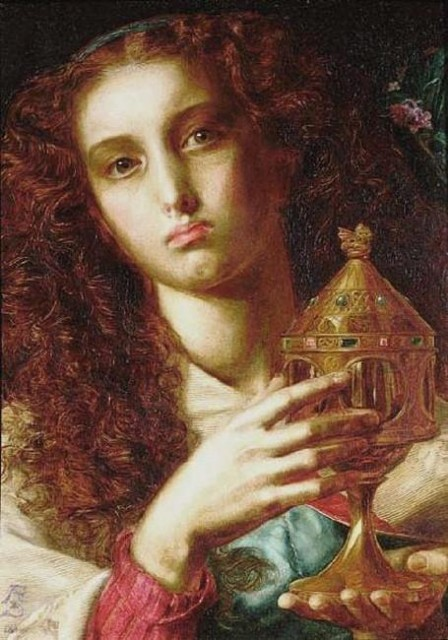
King Pelle's Daughter, 1861

Morgan le Fay, 1864, Birmingham Museum & Art Gallery

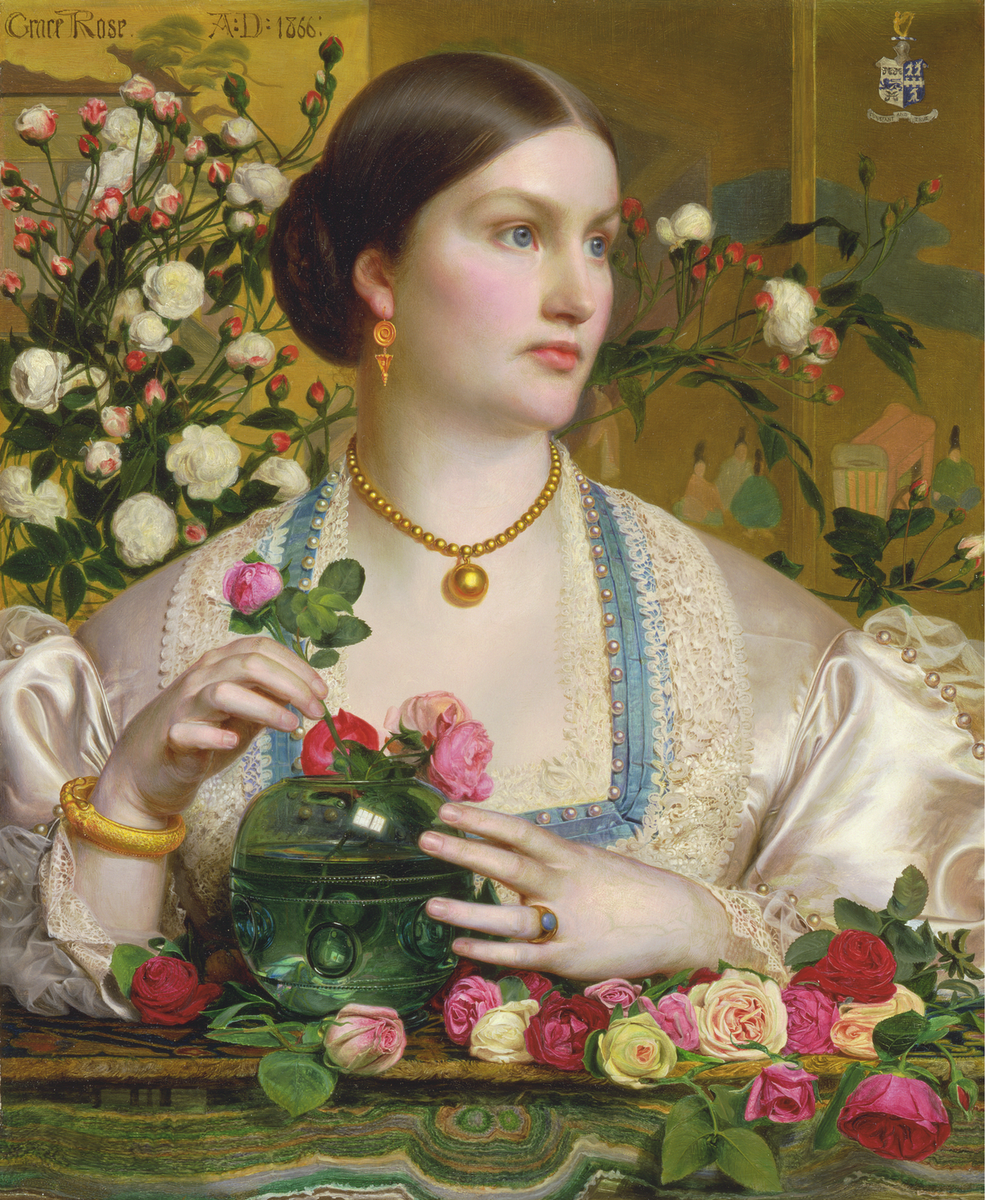
Grace Rose, 1866, Yale Center for British Art

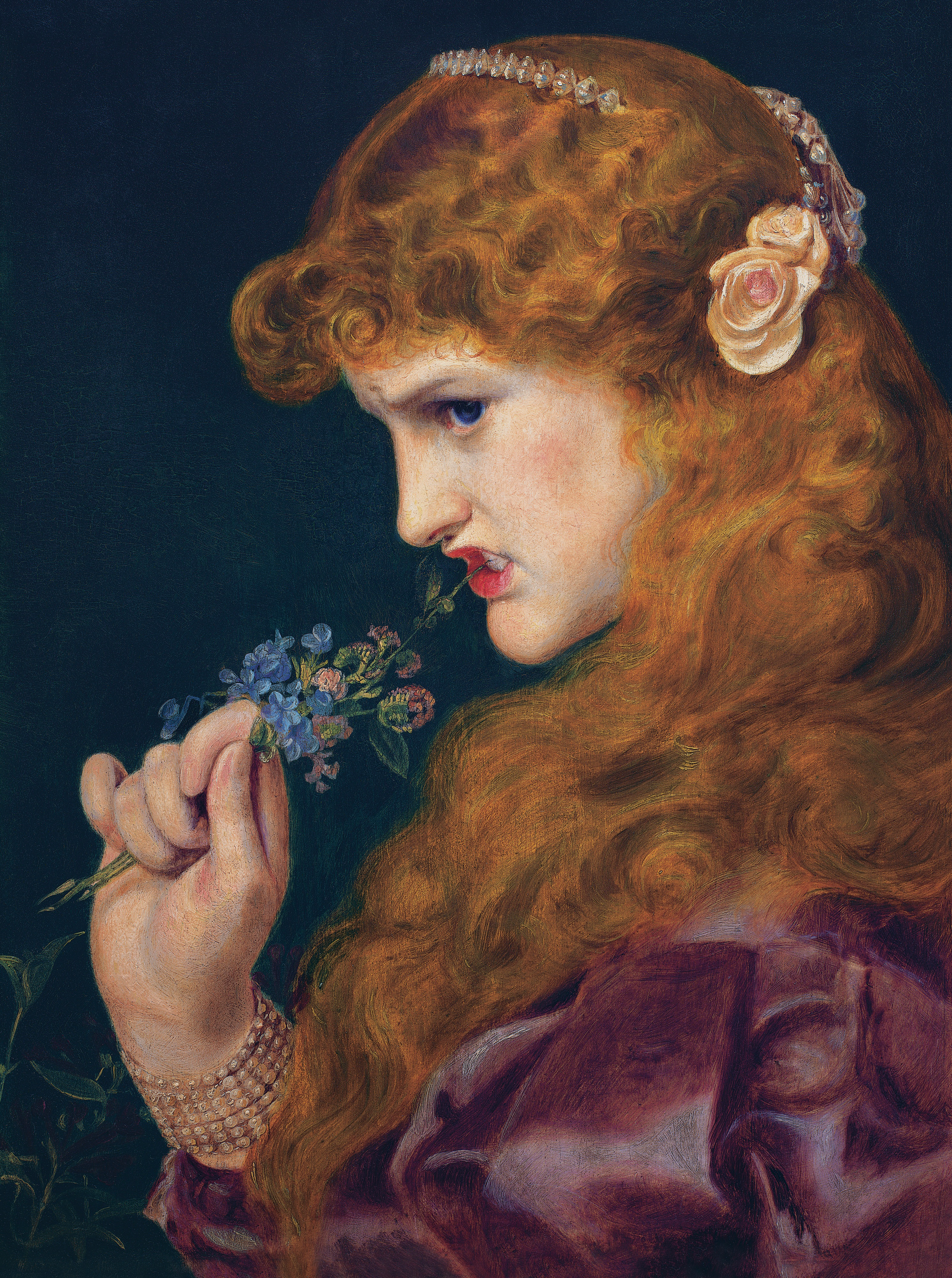
Love's Shadow, 1867

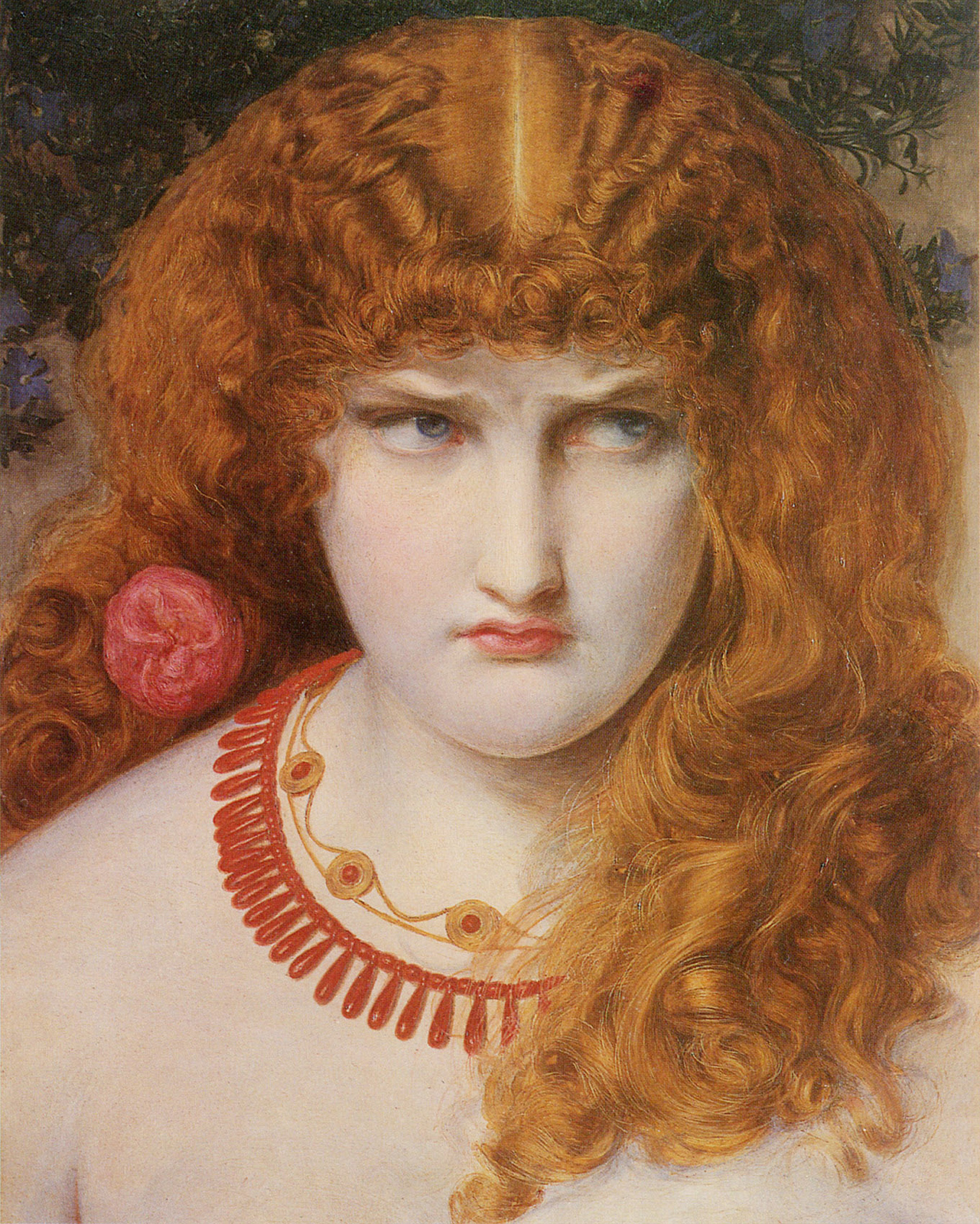
Helen of Troy, 1867, Walker Art Gallery

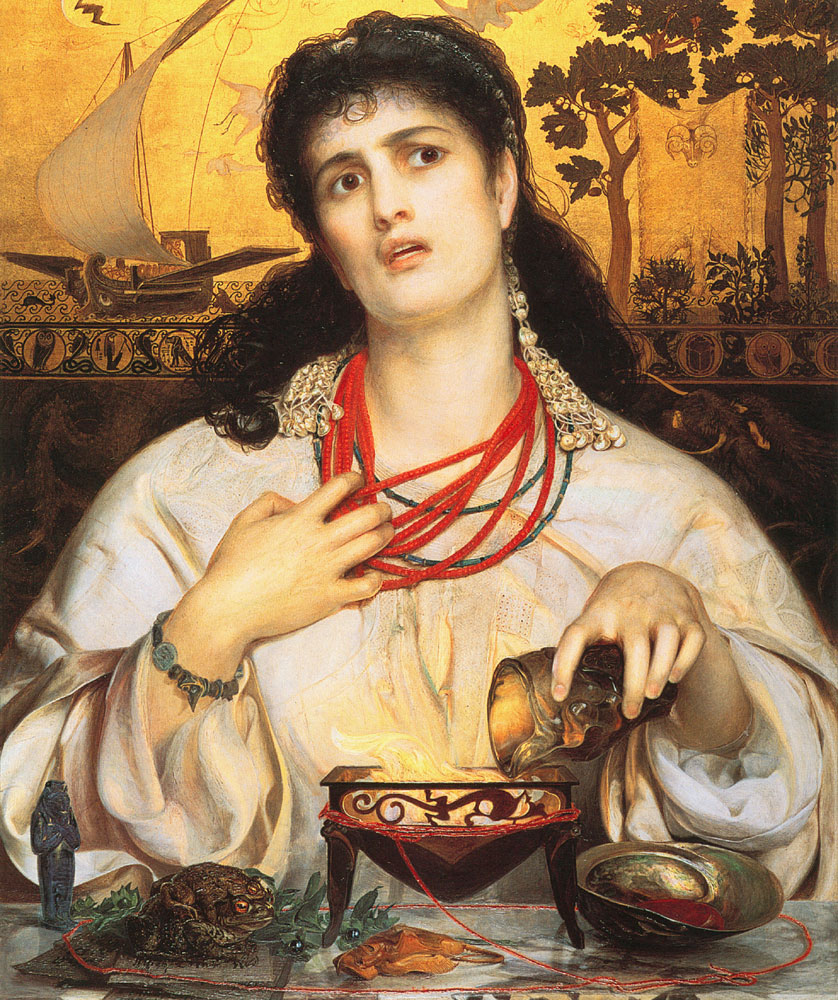
Medea, 1868, Birmingham Museum & Art Gallery

== See also ==
- Emma Sandys – painter, his sister
- List of Pre-Raphaelite paintings – including the work of Anthony Frederick Augustus Sandys.
