= Mary Woodall =

British art historian and museum director

Mary Woodall CBE (1901–1988) was a British art historian, museum director, and Thomas Gainsborough scholar.

== Life and work ==
Mary Woodall was born in Chelsea, west London, into the "industrial aristocracy". Her father was Henry Woodall, director of the Gas Light and Coke Company and son of Corbet Woodall, also in the energy business. Her mother was his wife Bertha (née Nettlefold), whose family wealth came from an engineering firm bearing their name.

She attended Cheltenham Ladies' College and then Somerville College, Oxford, where she studied history. After college she attended the Slade School of Fine Art, under Franklin White and it is there she first studied the drawings of Thomas Gainsborough. She was awarded a Ph.D. at the Courtauld Institute of Art in 1939 with a dissertation on Gainsborough's landscape drawings.

During World War II Birmingham Museum and Art Gallery had seven galleries bombed. In 1942 Woodall secured a position at the Birmingham Museum and Art Gallery as Keeper of Art, and under the director Trenchard Cox, who arrived in 1944, helped rebuild the damage. In 1948, she organised a pioneer exhibition of the works of Richard Wilson. In 1949 she published Thomas Gainsborough: his life and work; this book, in combination with her later related publications, remain key texts for Gainsborough scholars. In 1956 she became the museum director when Cox left.

Woodall retired from the gallery in 1964 and went on to hold positions on various museum/art related boards, including the Felton Trust for the National Gallery of Victoria (Australia), University College London and a trustee of the National Gallery, London.

In 1988 she died at age 87 in a nursing home in Burcot, Oxfordshire. She never married.

== Publications ==
- 1939: Gainsborough’s Landscape Drawings
- 1948: Catalogue of Pictures by Richard Wilson and his Circle. Birmingham: City Museum & Art Gallery
- Woodall, Mary (1949). Thomas Gainsborough, his life and work. London: Phoenix House. pp. 128.
- 1960: Catalogue of Paintings. Birmingham: Birmingham Museum and Art Gallery
- Woodall, Mary (1963). The Letters of Thomas Gainsborough. p. 184.
- Woodall, Mary (May 1970). Barnes and Nobles Art Series: Gainsborough. Littlehampton Book Services Ltd. p. 88. ISBN 0713734299.

== See also ==
- Women in the art history field
