= Trenchard Cox =

British museum director (1905–1995)

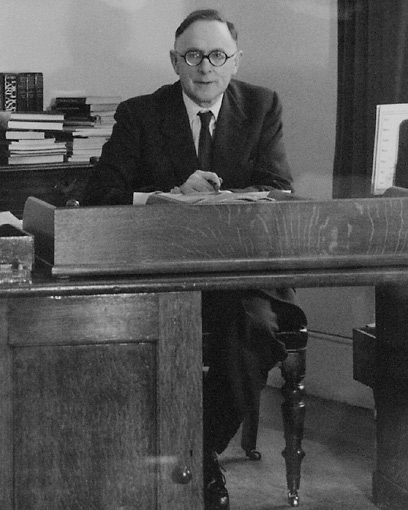
Sir George Trenchard Cox, CBE, MA, FSA, FMA, Photographer Maurice Ambler

Sir George Trenchard Cox CBE FSA (1905–1995) was a British museum director.

== Early years ==
Cox was born on 31 July 1905 in London to barrister William Pallett Cox and Marion. He was educated at Eton College and then at King's College, Cambridge, where he took a first class degree in modern languages tripos. Away from studying languages he was encouraged by family friend Cecil Harcourt-Smith (1859–1944), director of the Victoria and Albert Museum (1909–24) to develop an interest in the arts. This was inspired further by Sydney Cockerell, director of the Fitzwilliam Museum in Cambridge (1908–37), to pursue a career in museums.

Cox started work as a volunteer at the National Gallery, London and then in the Department of Prints and Drawings at the British Museum. During this time he spent a semester at Berlin University studying Art History. He spent a short time at the Sorbonne which led to him writing a study of the French Renaissance painter Jehan Foucquet in 1931. In 1932 Cox became assistant to the Director, Sir James Mann, at the Wallace Collection. During this time he developed a keen interest in the decorative arts of eighteenth-century France and went on to contribute to the catalogue of the exhibition of French Art at Burlington House.

In 1935 he married Maisie Anderson. In the summer of 1939, with Mann abroad, Cox was charged with organising the Wallace Collection's evacuation from London. After this time he became private secretary to Sir Alexander Maxwell, the permanent under-secretary at the Home Office.

== Birmingham City Museum and Art Gallery ==
In 1944 Cox's skills as an administrator saw him take up the post of Director of Birmingham Museum and Art Gallery. He restored the museum buildings back to the original function, after they had been used as council offices for 5 years during the war, managing to refurbish and restore them on a tight budget. With the help of the Keeper of the Department of Art, Dr. Mary Woodall, he established excellent relations with the Birmingham Corporation and established the museum as a leading institution. Cox is well known for the care and support he gave to museum staff, always remembering to send a note of congratulation to those responsible for a new exhibition or display. In 1947 he published a book on David Cox (no relation), Birmingham's most famous landscape painter. In 1954 he was made a Commander of the Order of the British Empire (CBE).

== Victoria and Albert Museum ==
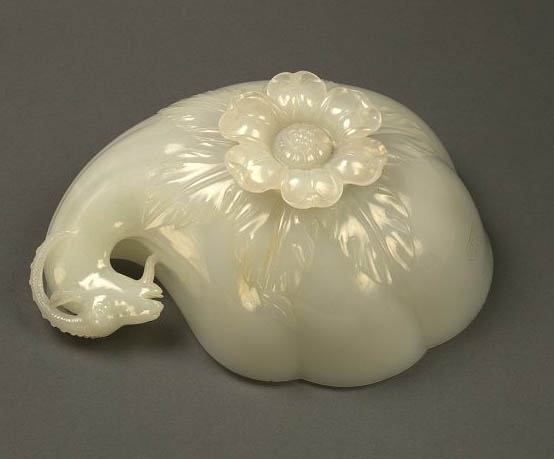
Wine Cup, made 1657, V&A Museum no. IS.12-1962

In 1955 Cox was offered the post of Director and Secretary of the Victoria and Albert Museum by David Eccles, Minister of Eductation. He is known to have learnt the names of all of the museum's several hundred staff within three weeks of starting the job and greeted everyone thereafter by name. He is also responsible for introducing the conservation and education departments to the museum and reorganised and extended the National Art Library. Cox acquired important objects such as the jade wine cup of the Shah Jahan and created a high standard of exhibitions, notably 'Opus Anglicanum' in 1963 and 'The Orange and the Rose' in 1964. In 1966 he retired early due to failing eyesight.

== Other offices ==
Cox was knighted in 1961. In 1963 he became president of the Museums Association, he was member of the Ancient Monuments Board for England 1959–69 and the Standing Commission on Museums and Galleries 1967–77 and appointed Chevalier of the Legion of Honour in 1967. Continuing his interest in popular education, he was the founding president in 1968 of the National Association of Decorative and Fine Arts Societies (NADFAS), and a fellow of the Royal Society of Arts and of the Society of Antiquities. From 1968 to 1979 he served as Peoples' Warden at St Martin-in-the-Fields, where he was a strong supporter its social welfare activities. He died on 21 December 1995.

Photographs by Trenchard Cox are held at the Conway Library in the Courtauld, London, and are being digitised.
