= Birmingham Museum and Art Gallery =

Museum and art gallery in Birmingham, England

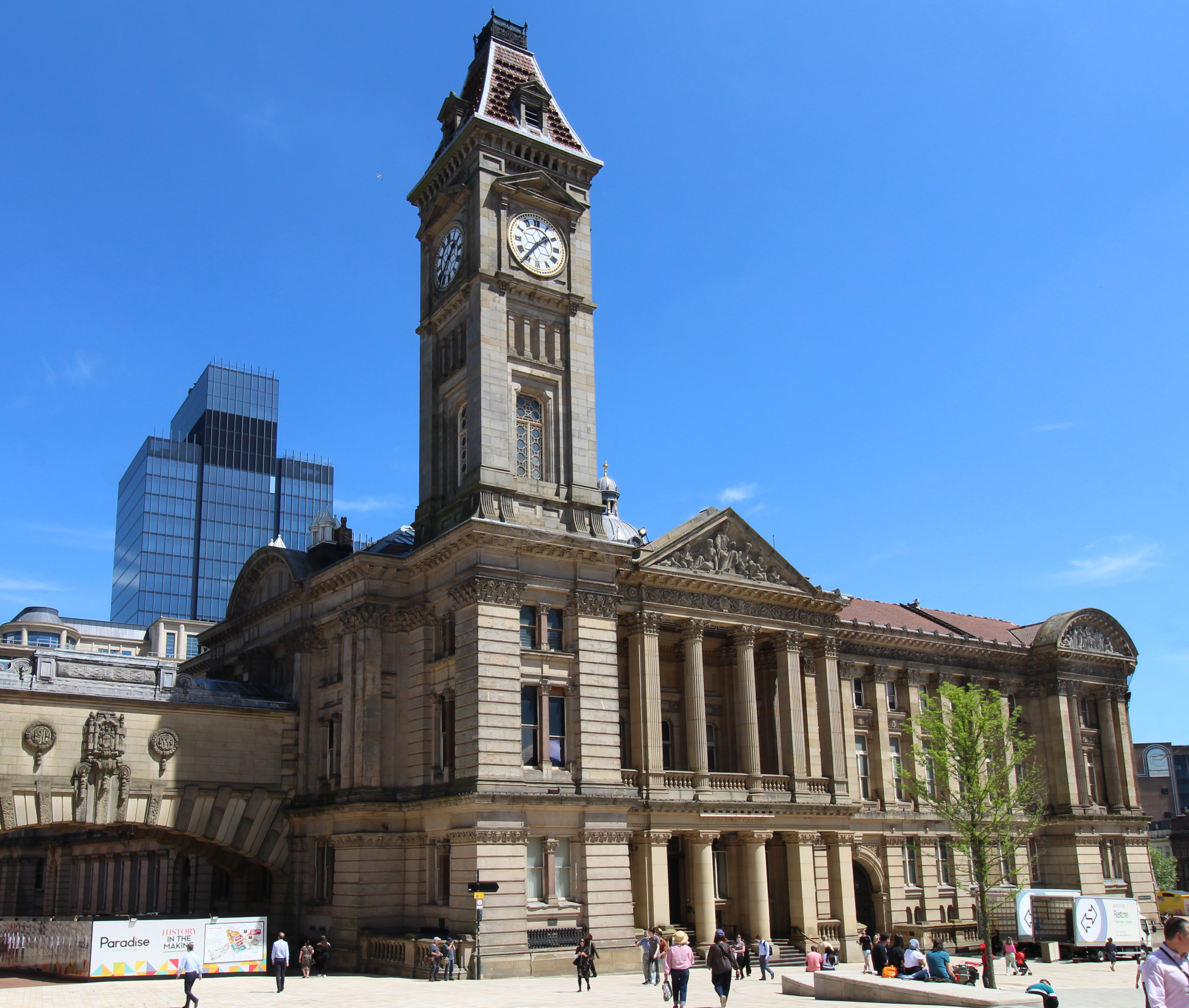

- Location in West Midlands
- Established: 28 November 1885
- Coordinates: 52°28′49″N 1°54′13″W
- Collection size: c. 800,000 objects
- Visitors: 672,391 (2025)
- Website: birminghammuseums.org.uk

Listed Building – Grade II*
- Designated: 25 April 1952
- Reference no.: 1210333

Birmingham Museum and Art Gallery (BM&AG) is a museum and art gallery in Birmingham, England. It has a collection of international importance covering fine art, ceramics, metalwork, jewellery, natural history, archaeology, ethnography, local history and industrial history.

The museum/gallery is run by Birmingham Museums Trust, the largest independent museums trust in the United Kingdom, which also runs eight other museums around the city. Entrance to the Museum and Art Gallery is free, but some major exhibitions in the Gas Hall incur an entrance fee.

== History ==
In 1829, the Birmingham Society of Artists created a private exhibition building in New Street, Birmingham while the historical precedent for public education around that time produced the Factory Act 1833, the first instance of Government funding for education.

The Museums Act 1845 "empowered boroughs with a population of 10,000 or more to raise a 1/2d for the establishment of museums." In 1864, the first public exhibition room, was opened when the Society and other donors presented 64 pictures as well as the Sultanganj Buddha to Birmingham Council and these were housed in the Free Library building but, due to lack of space, the pictures had to move to Aston Hall. Joseph Henry Nettlefold (1827–1881) bequeathed twenty-five pictures by David Cox to Birmingham Art Gallery on the condition it opened on Sundays.

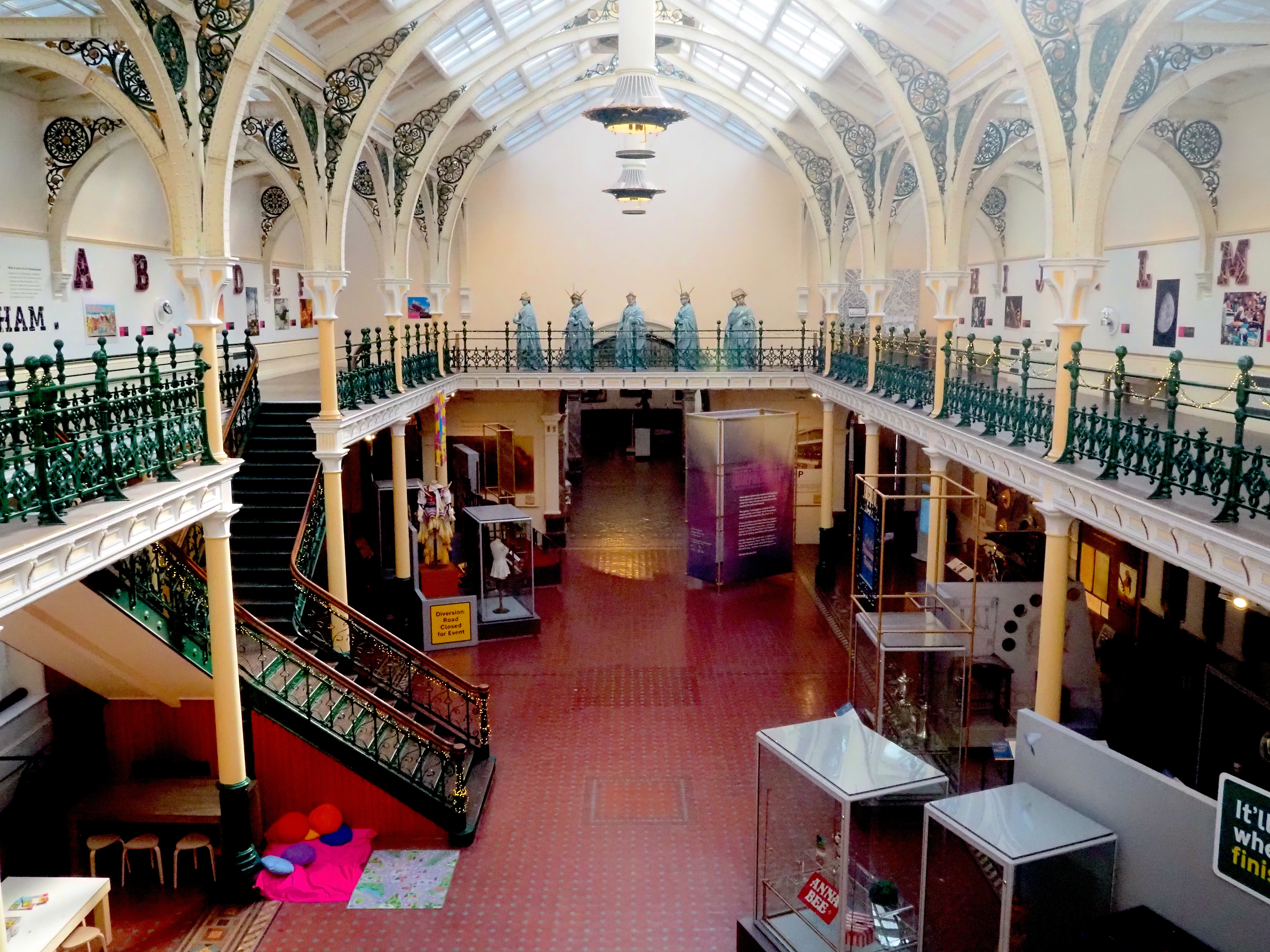
Industrial Gallery in 2026, the original part of the Art Gallery

In June 1880, local artist Allen Edward Everitt accepted the post of honorary curator of the Free Art Gallery, a municipal institution which was the forerunner of the Birmingham Museum and Art Gallery.

Jesse Collings, Mayor of Birmingham 1878–79, was responsible for free libraries in Birmingham and was the original proponent of the Birmingham Art Gallery. A gift of £10,000 (equivalent to £870,000 in 2020) made by Sir Richard and George Tangye started a new drive for an art gallery and, in 1885, following other donations and £40,000 from the council, the Prince of Wales officially opened the new gallery on Saturday 28 November 1885. The Museum and Art Gallery occupied an extended part of the Council House above the new offices of the municipal Gas Department (which in effect subsidised the venture thus circumventing the Public Libraries Act 1850 which limited the use of public funds on the arts). The building was designed by Yeoville Thomason. The metalwork for the new building (and adjoining Council House) was by the Birmingham firm of Hart, Son, Peard & Co. and extended to both the interior and exterior including the distinctive cast-iron columns in the main gallery space for the display of decorative art. The lofty portico, surmounted by a pediment by Francis John Williamson, representing an allegory of Birmingham contributing to the fine arts, was together with the clock-tower considered the "most conspicuous features" of the exterior upon its opening. By 1900 the collection, especially its contemporary British holdings, was deemed by the Magazine of Art to be "one of the finest and handsomest" in Britain.

Until 1946, when property taxes were voted towards acquisitions, the museum relied on the generosity of private individuals. John Feeney provided £50,000 to provide a further gallery.

Seven galleries had to be rebuilt after being bombed in 1940. Immediately after World War II "Mighty Mary" Mary Woodall (1901–1988) was appointed keeper of art under director, Trenchard Cox. Woodall and Cox, through their links to the London art world, were able to attract exhibitions, much publicity and donations to the gallery. In 1956, Woodall replaced Cox when the latter became Director of the Victoria and Albert Museum. John Woodward (1921–1988) was Keeper of Art from 1956 to 1964.

In 1951, the Museum of Science and Industry, Birmingham was incorporated into BM&AG. In 2001, the Science Museum closed with some exhibits being transferred to Thinktank, Birmingham Science Museum, which was operated by the independent Thinktank Trust that has since become part of Birmingham Museums Trust.

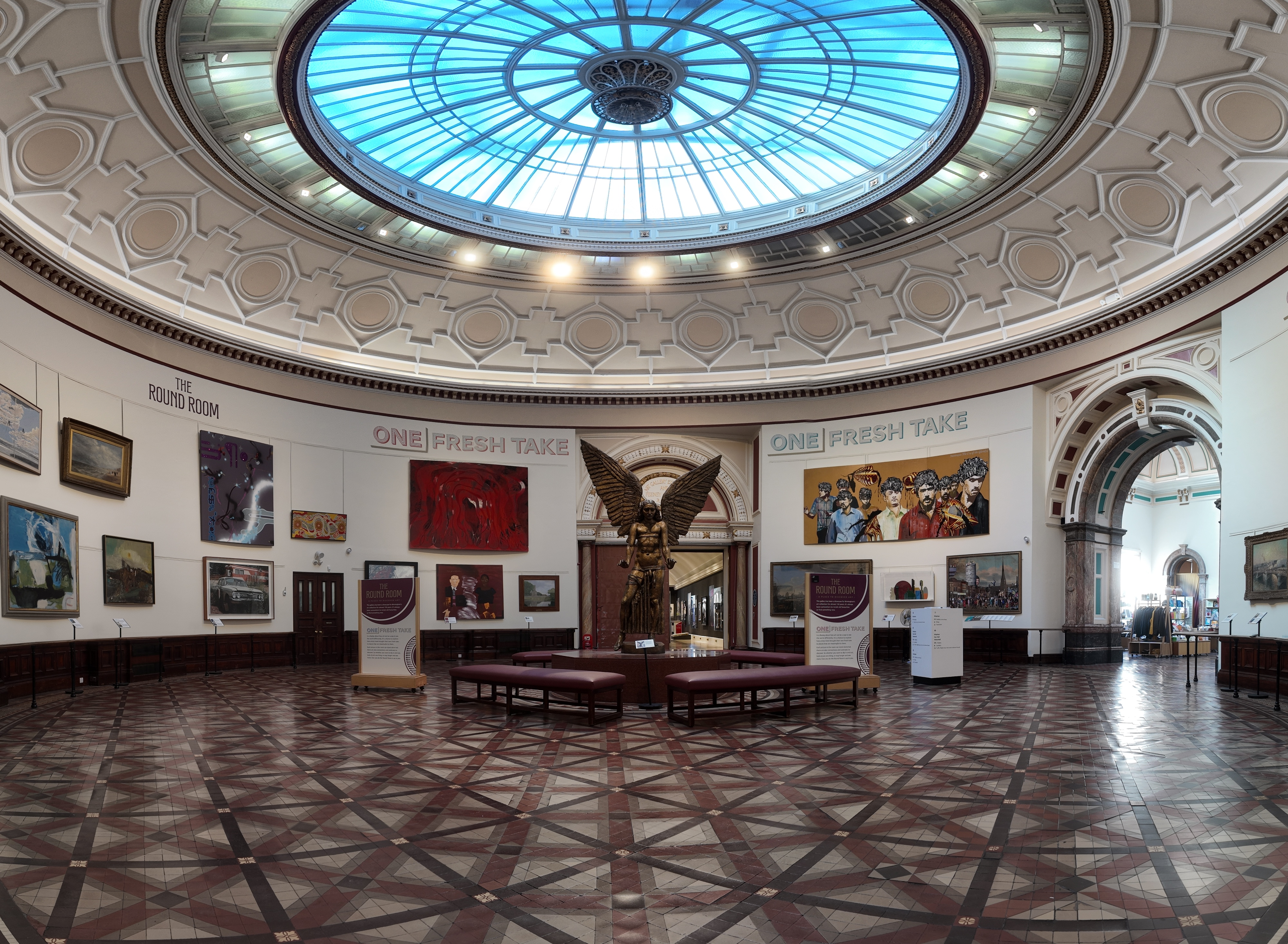
The Round Room with Jacob Epstein's The Archangel Lucifer

The main entrance is located in Chamberlain Square below the clock-tower known locally as "Big Brum". The entrance hall memorial reads 'By the gains of Industry we promote Art'. The Extension Block has entrances via the Gas Hall in Edmund Street and Great Charles Street. Waterhall, the original gas department, has its own entrance on Edmund Street.

In October 2010, the Waterhall closed as a BM&AG gallery as a result of a £1.5m cut to Birmingham Museums and Art Gallery's budget in 2010–11. The last BM&AG exhibition that took place in the Waterhall at that time was the Steve McCurry retrospective that ran from 26 June to 17 October 2010. The Waterhall and the Gas Hall have reopened for exhibitions throughout the year.

BM&AG, formerly managed by Birmingham City Council, is now, with Thinktank, part of Birmingham Museums Trust.

Due to the global pandemic, the museum closed in October 2020. The museum remained closed throughout 2021 as part of a project to rewire the Council complex that houses the museum. The museum partially reopened in April 2022 with a number of pop-up exhibitions. It closed again in December 2022. The museum reopened in October 2024. Approximately 70% of the museum spaces are currently open. Open galleries including the Round Room, Industrial Gallery, history galleries and Bridge Gallery reopened on 24 October 2024, as did the tearoom and shop.

An exhibition on Ozzy Osbourne's life was put on display at the museum on 25 June 2025 (prior to his death), featuring memorabilia, photographs, and tributes to his career and legacy. Originally scheduled to close on 28 September 2025, the exhibition was extended to 18 January 2026 following public demand and tributes after his death.

== Art Gallery collection highlights ==
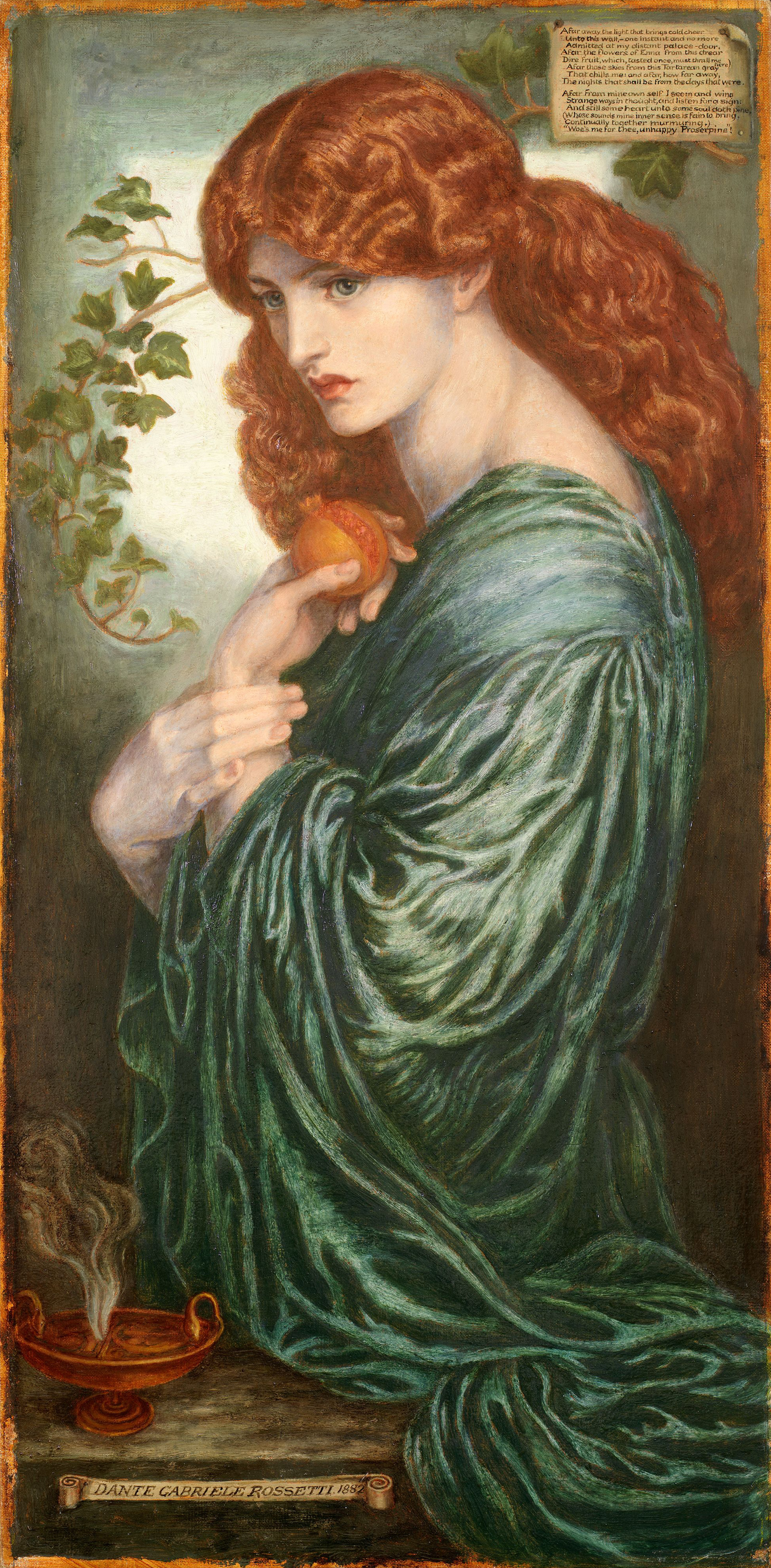
Dante Gabriel Rossetti,
Proserpine

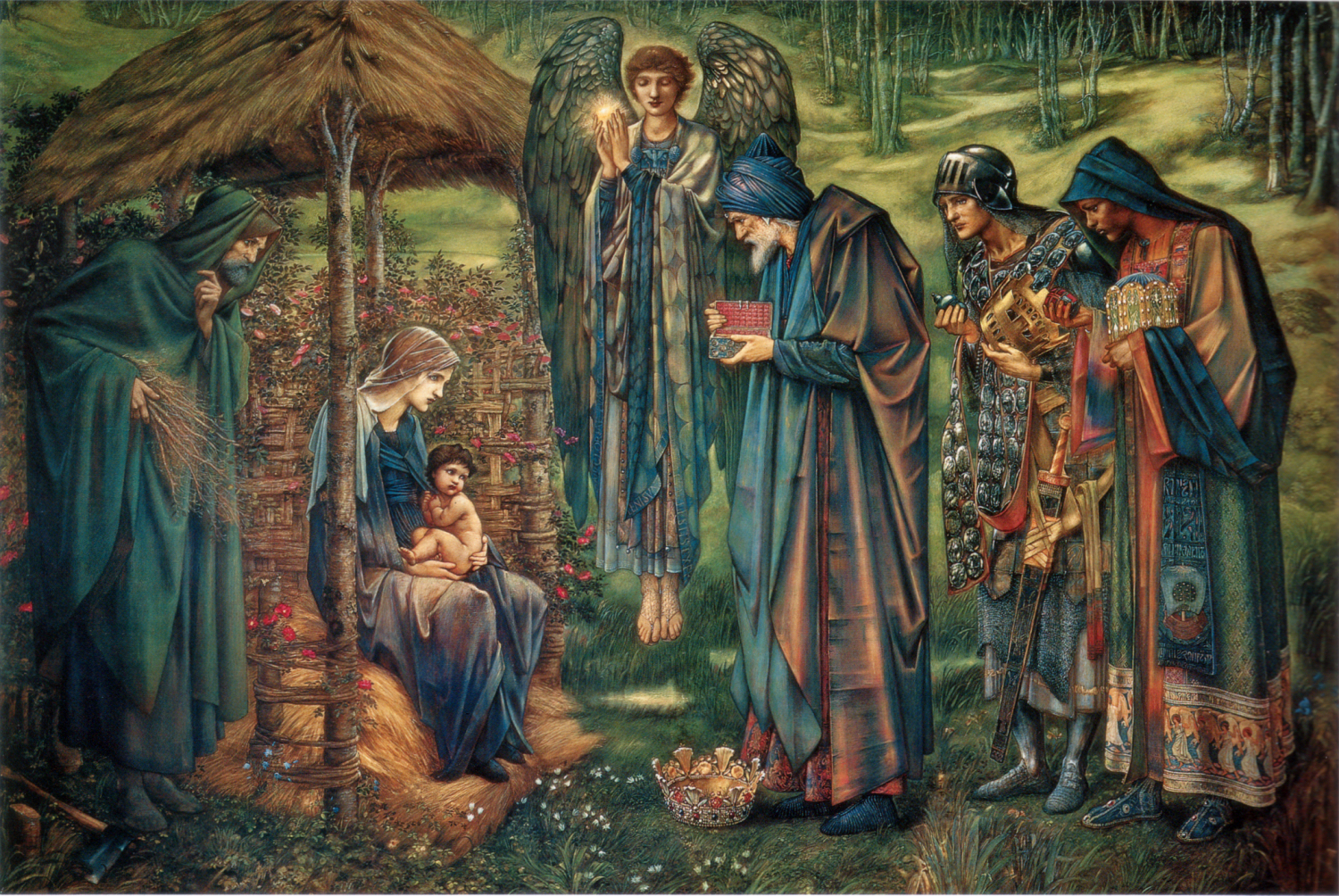
Edward Burne-Jones,
The Star of Bethlehem

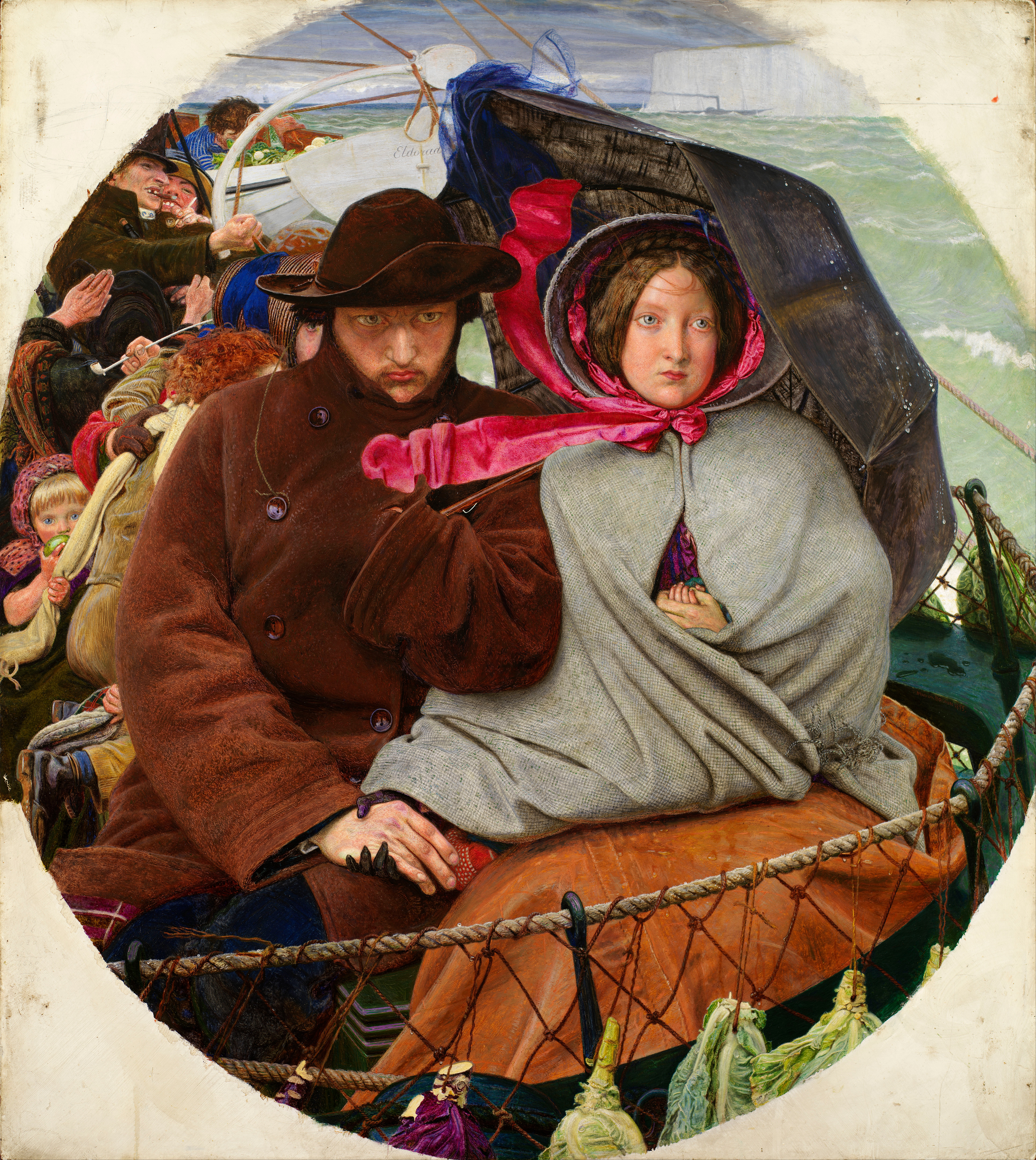
Ford Madox Brown,
The Last of England

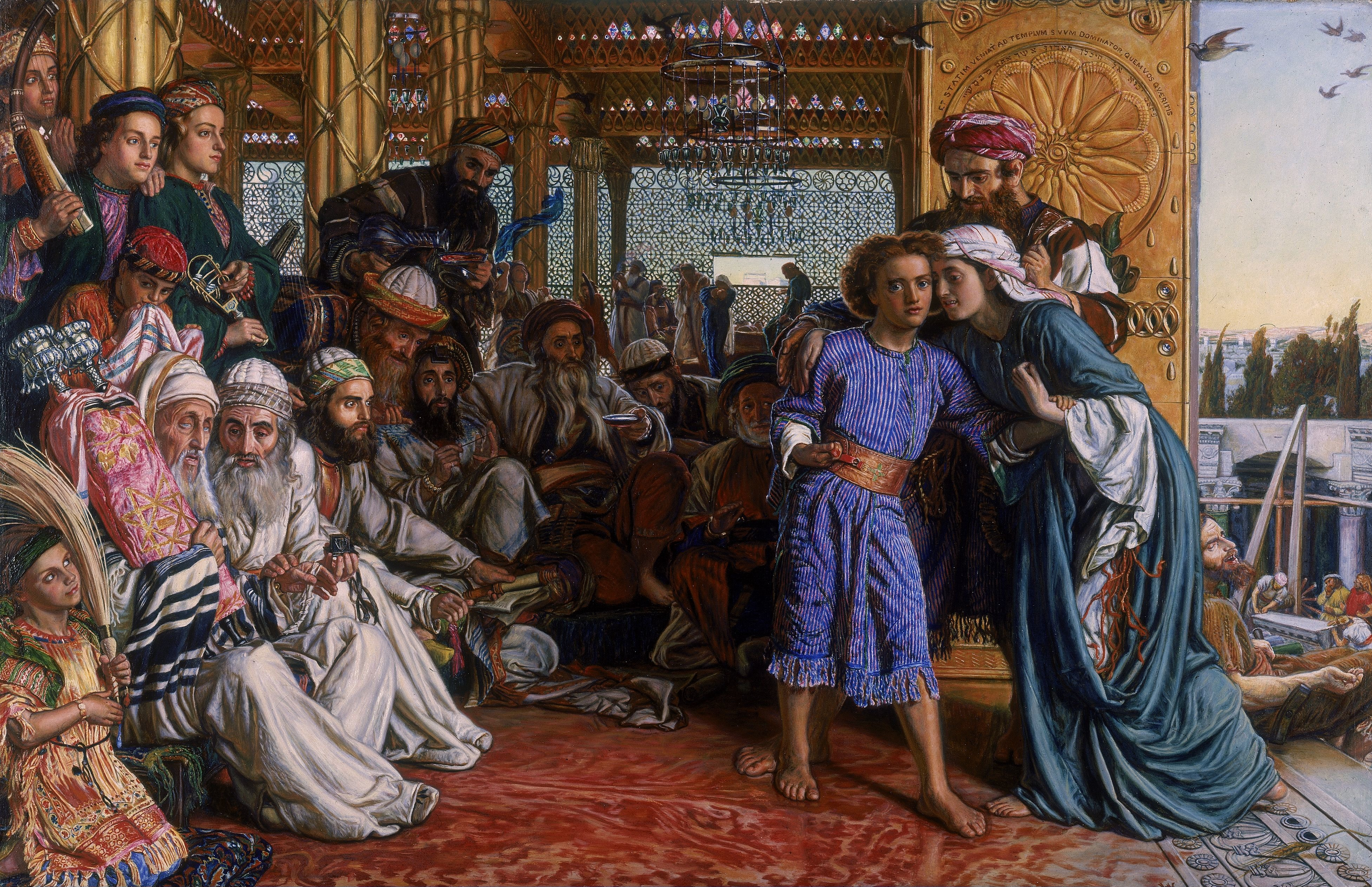
William Holman Hunt,
The Finding of the Saviour in the Temple

Frederick Sandys, Morgan le Fay, 1864

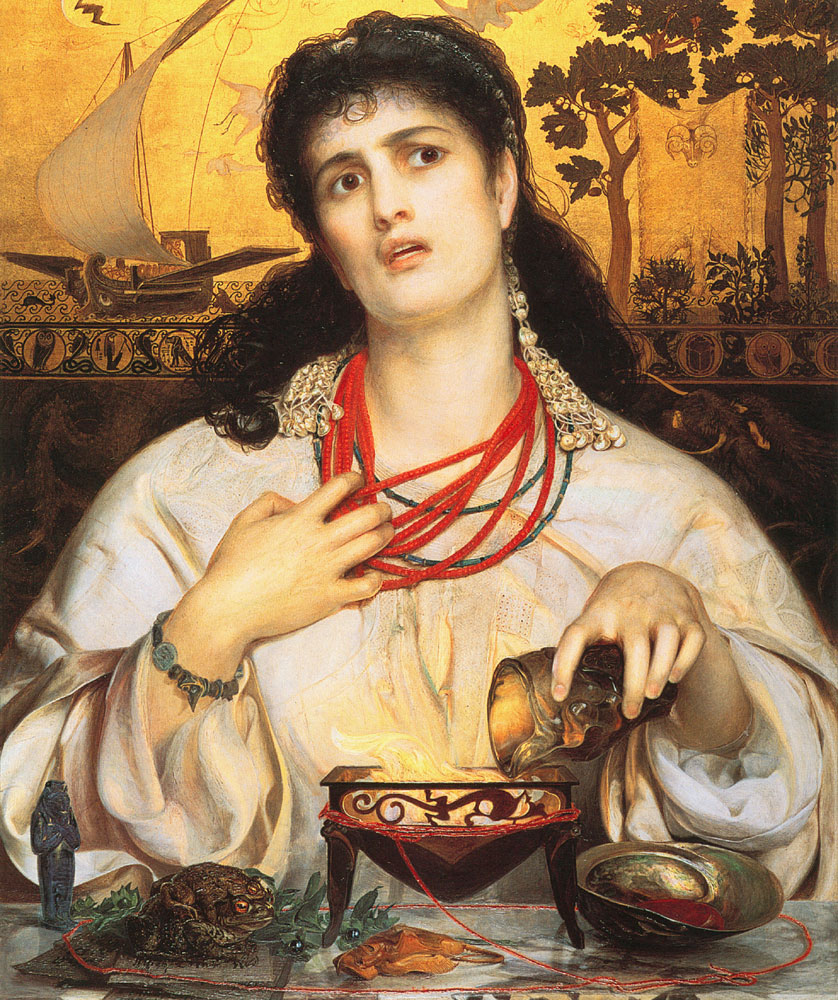
Frederick Sandys,
Medea

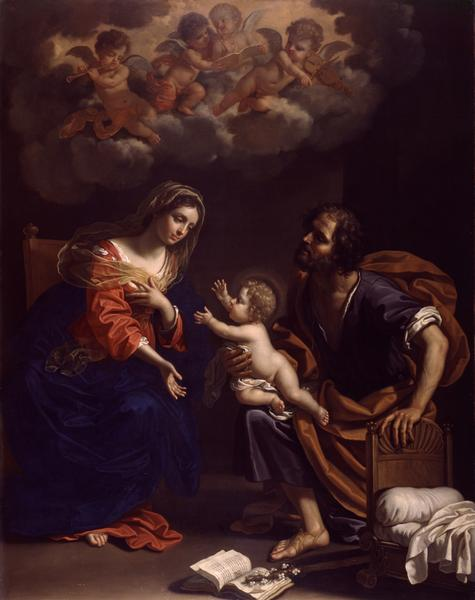
Benedetto Gennari II,
The Holy Family

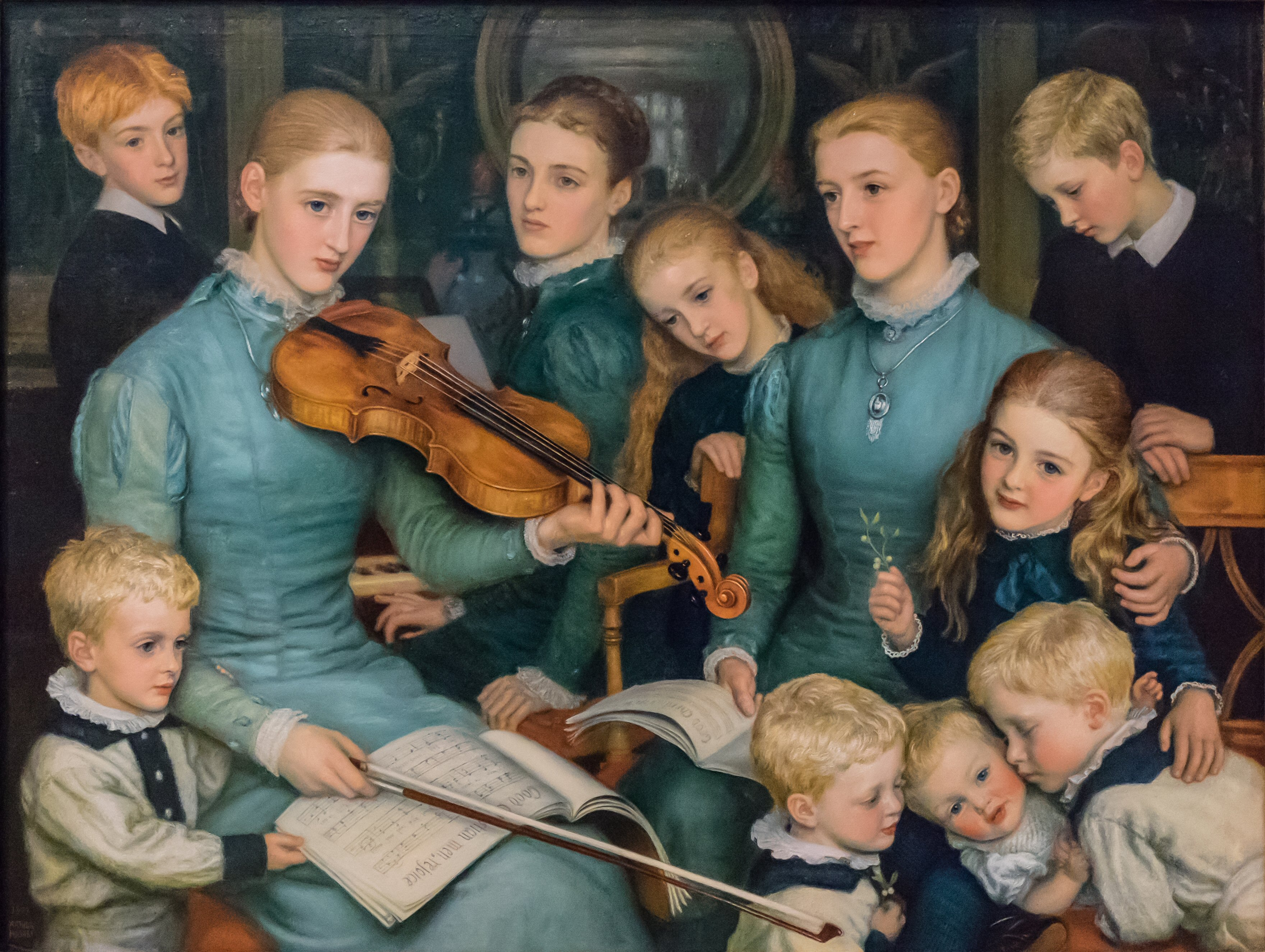
Arthur Hughes
A Christmas Carol at Bracken Dene

== Paintings ==
The Art Gallery is most noted for its extensive collections of paintings ranging from the 14th to the 21st century. They include works by the Pre-Raphaelite Brotherhood and the world's largest collection of works by Edward Burne-Jones. Notable painters in oil include the following:

English School

- Constable, John – 2 paintings;
- Cox, David – 11 paintings;
- Gainsborough, Thomas – 3 paintings;
- Hogarth, William – 2 paintings;
- Landseer, Sir Edwin – 1 painting;
- Lely, Peter – 2 paintings;
- Turner, J. M. W. – 1 painting;
- Bacon, Francis – 1 painting;
- Spencer, Stanley – 3 paintings;
- Lanyon, Peter – 1 painting;
- Heron, Patrick – 1 painting;
- Jones, Allen – 1 painting;

Paintings from the Dutch School include a painting each from Jan van Goyen and Willem van de Velde the Younger.

Flemish School

- Christus, Petrus – 1 painting;
- Rubens, Peter Paul – 1 painting;

French School

- Dufrénoy, Georges – 1 painting;
- Dughet, Gaspard – 1 painting;
- Gellée, Claude – 2 painting;

Impressionists

- Degas, Edgar – 1 painting;
- Pissarro, Camille – 1 painting;
- Renoir, Pierre-Auguste – 1 painting;

German School

- Zoffany, Johan – 1 painting;

Italian School

- Batoni, Pompeo – 1 painting;
- Bellini, Giovanni – 1 painting;
- Botticelli, Sandro – 1 painting;
- Canaletto, (Giovanni Antonio Canal) – 2 paintings;
- Crespi, Giuseppe – 1 painting;
- Dolci, Carlo – 1 painting;
- il Garofalo, Benvenuto Tisio – 1 painting;
- Gentileschi, Orazio – 1 painting;
- Guardi, Francesco – 1 painting;
- Guercino, (Giovanni Francesco Barbieri) – 1 painting;
- Martini, Simone – 1 painting;
- Reni, Guido – 1 painting;
- Rosa, Salvator – 1 painting;
- Schiavone, Andrea – 1 painting;
- Strozzi, Bernardo – 1 painting;

Spanish School

- Murillo, Bartolomé-Esteban – 1 painting.

== Antiquities ==
The collection of antiquities includes coins from ancient times through to the Middle Ages, artefacts from Ancient India and Central Asia, Ancient Cyprus and Ancient Egypt. The museum also holds 28 pieces of Nimrud ivories from the British School of Archaeology in Iraq. There is material from Classical Greece, the Roman Empire and Latin America. There is also mediaeval material, much of which is now on display in The Birmingham History Galleries, a permanent exhibition on the third floor of the museum.

In November 2014, a dedicated gallery was opened to display the Staffordshire Hoard. Discovered in the nearby village of Hammerwich in 2009, it was the largest hoard of Anglo-Saxon gold ever found.

In respect of local and industrial history, the tower of the Birmingham HP Sauce factory was a famous landmark alongside the Aston Expressway which was demolished in the summer of 2007. The giant logo from the top of the tower is now in the collection of the Museum.

== Gallery ==
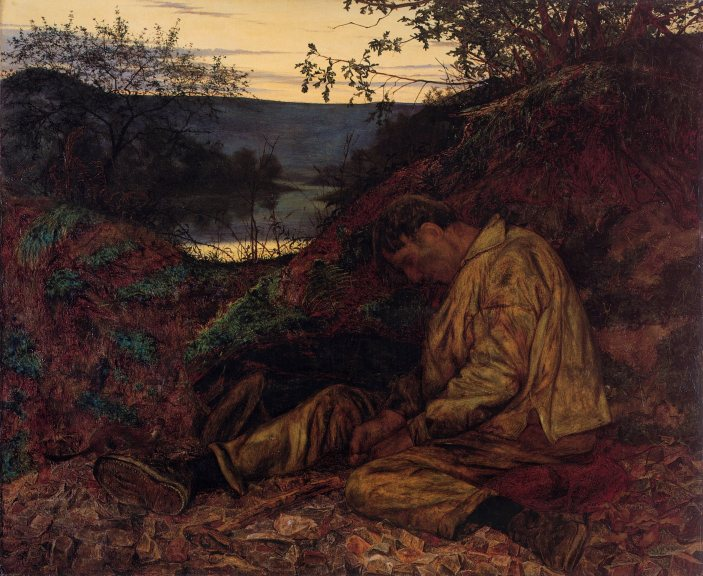
The Stonebreaker by Henry Wallis

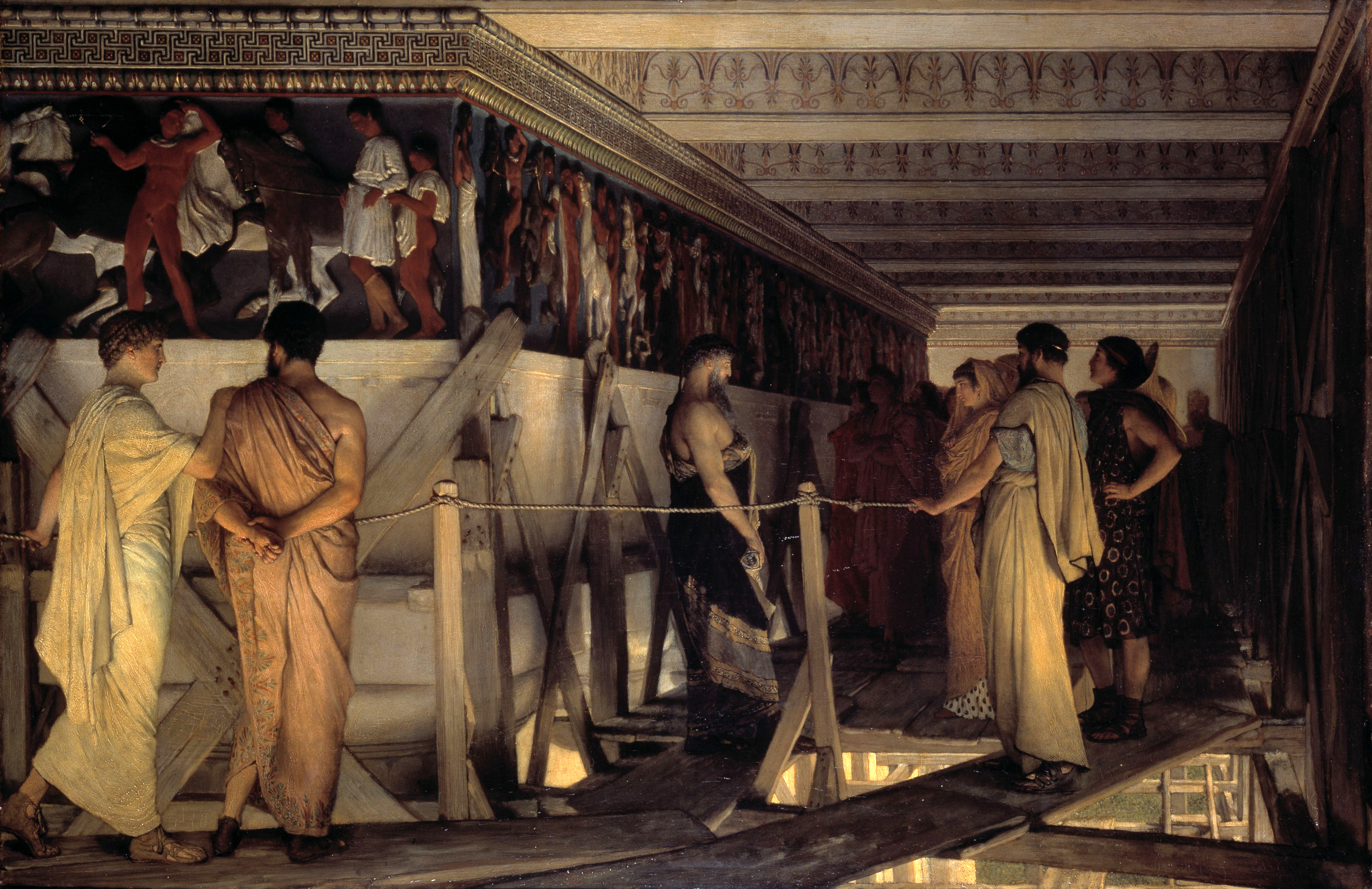
Phidias Showing the Frieze of the Parthenon to his Friends by Lawrence Alma-Tadema

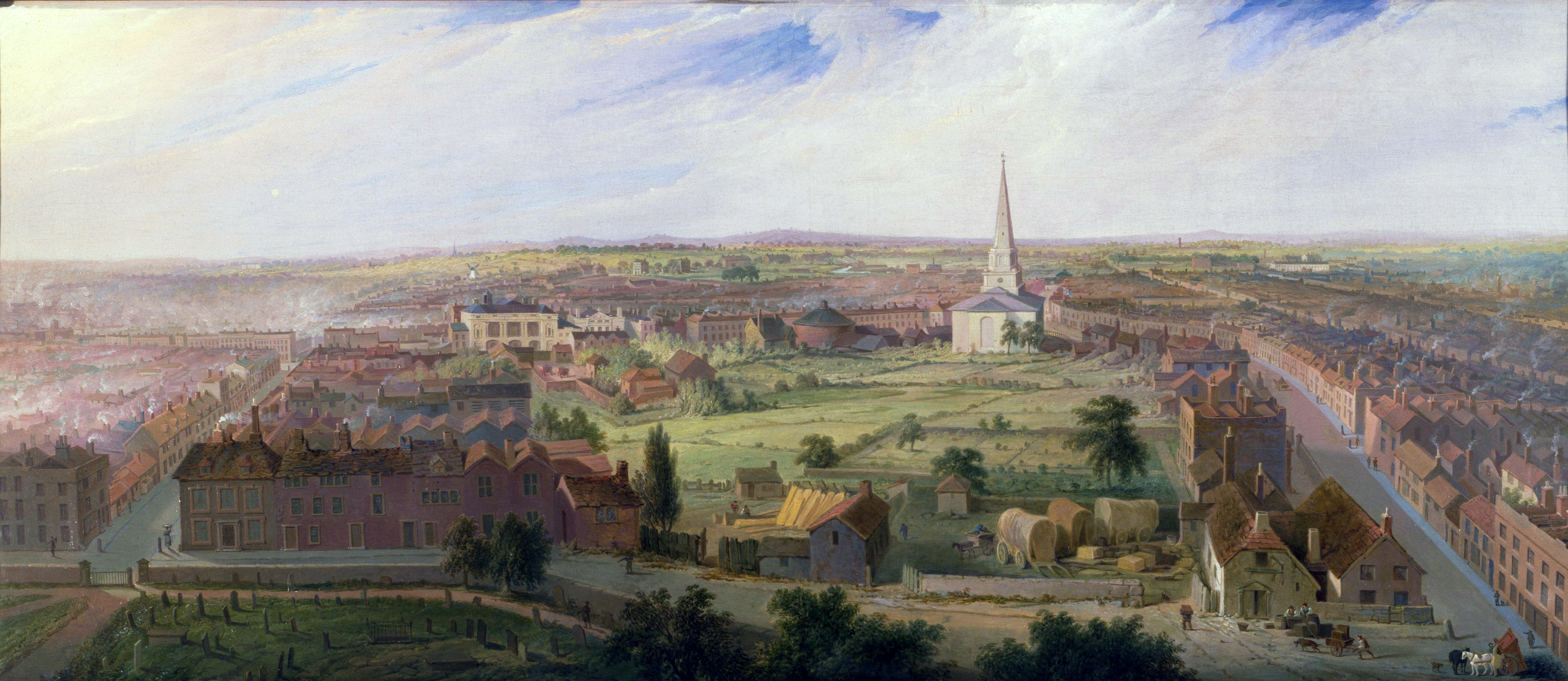
Birmingham from the Dome of St Philip's Church by Samuel Lines
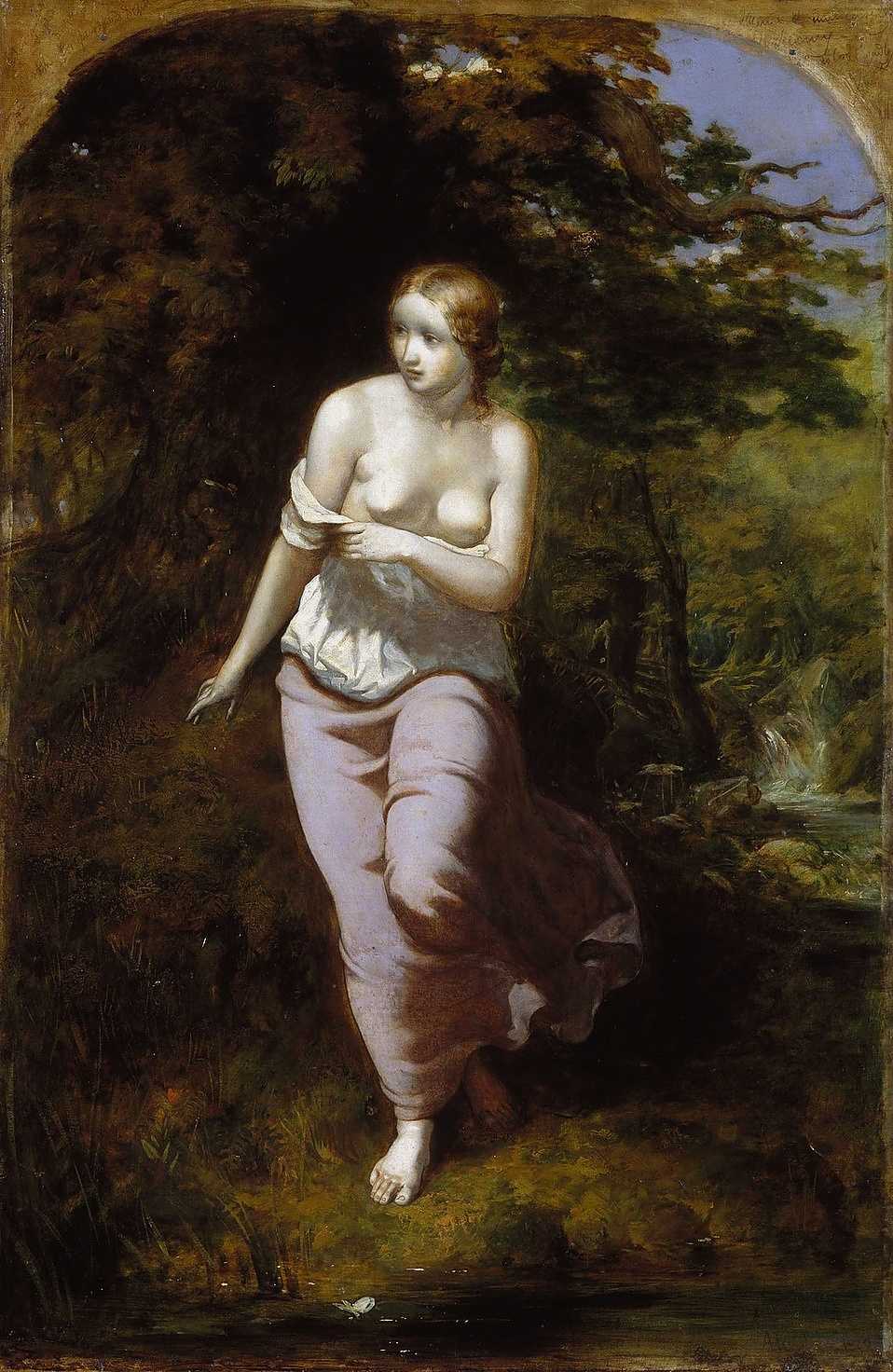
Musidora Bathing by Arthur Hughes

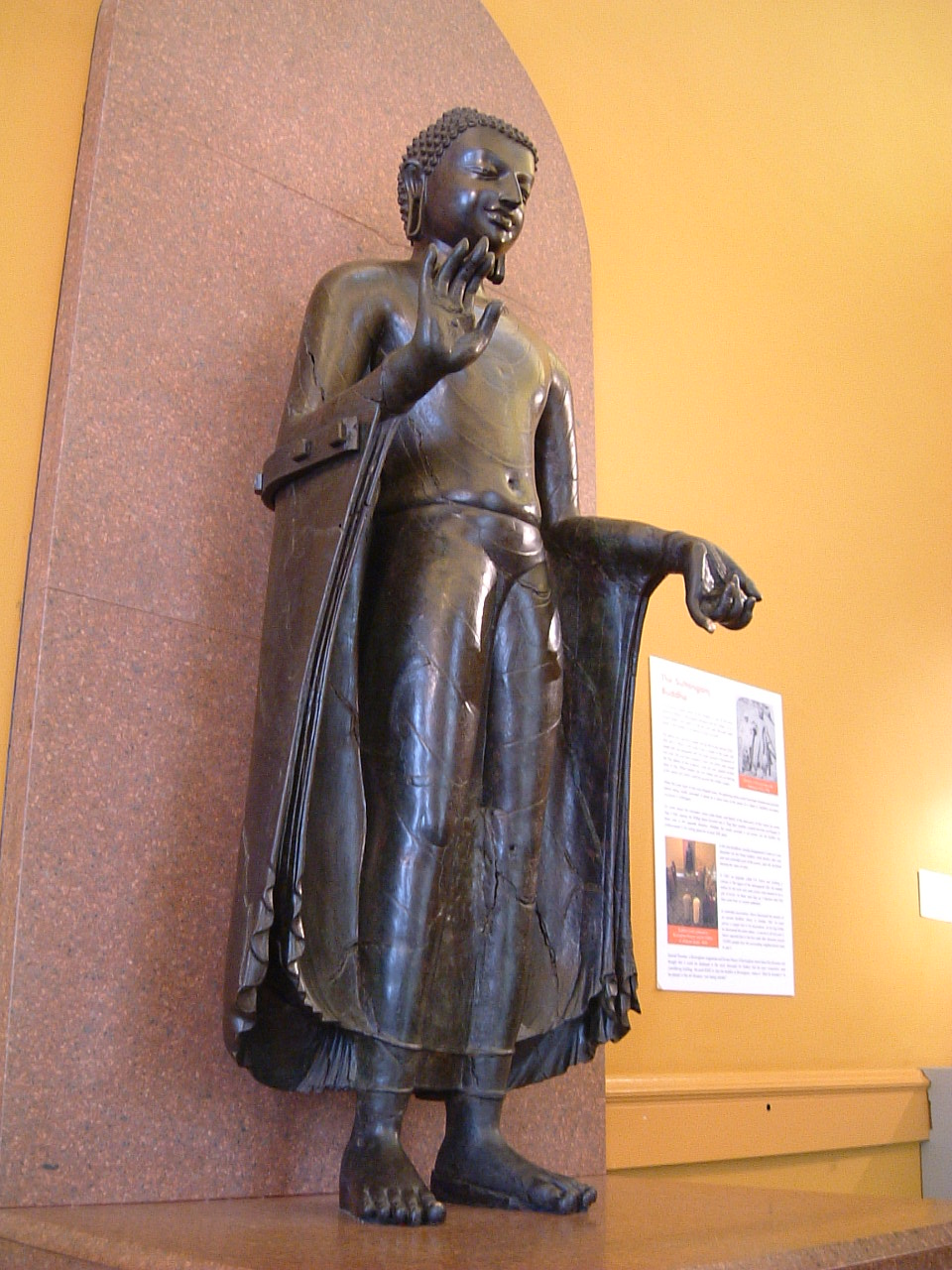
The Sultanganj Buddha

The Blind Girl by John Everett Millais

== See also ==
- Mercian Trail

== Bibliography ==
- All About Victoria Square, Joe Holyoak, The Victorian Society Birmingham Group, ISBN 0-901657-14-X.
- By the Gains of Industry – Birmingham Museums and Art Gallery 1885–1985, Stuart Davies, ISBN 0-7093-0131-6.
- Public Sculpture of Birmingham including Sutton Coldfield, George T. Noszlopy, edited Jeremy Beach, 1998, ISBN 0-85323-692-5.
- Historic England. "Council House, City Museum and Art Gallery and Council House extension (1210333)". National Heritage List for England.
