= Love's Shadow =

1867 painting by Frederick Sandys

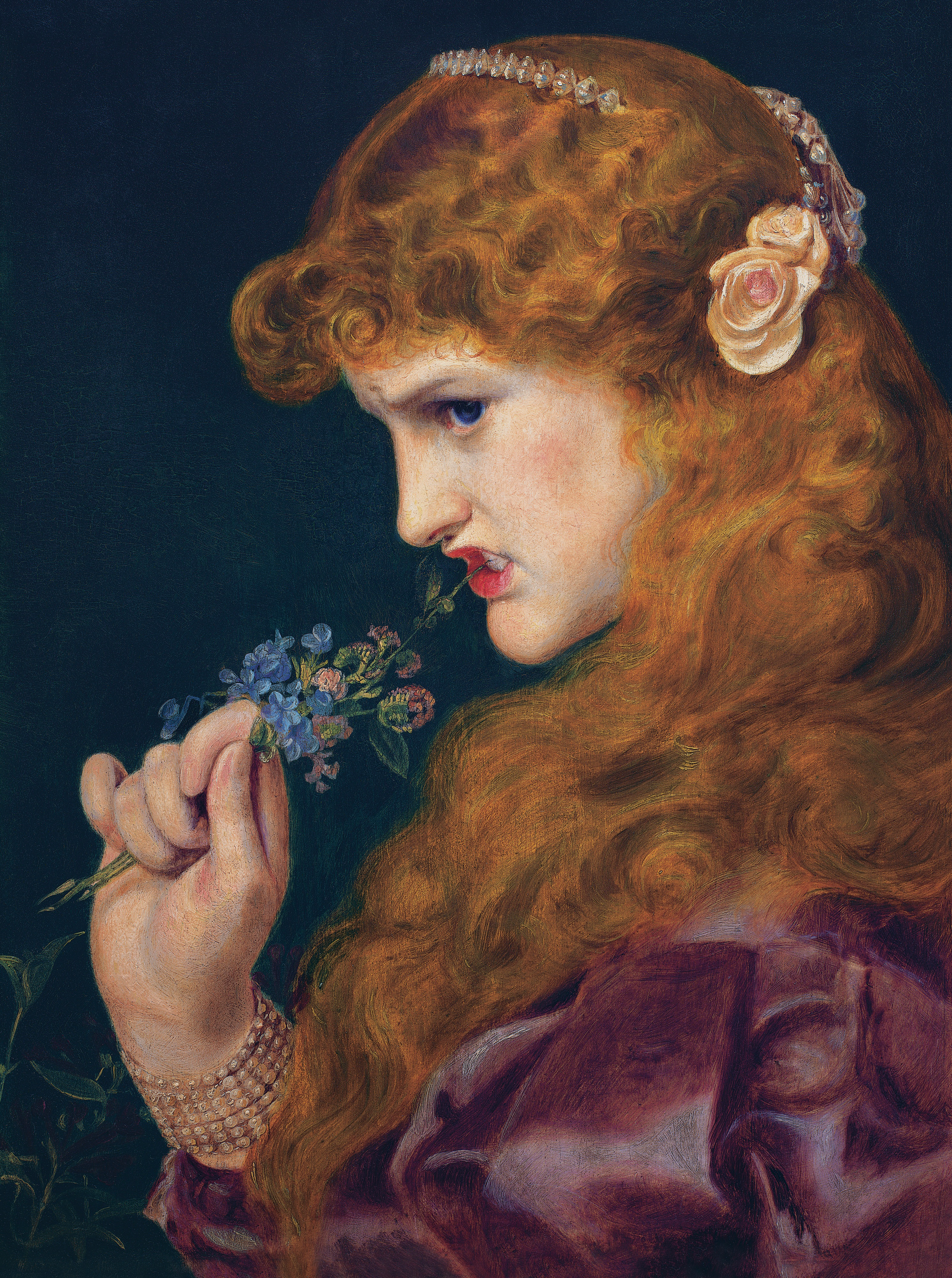
- Artist: Frederick Sandys
- Year: 1867
- Medium: oil on panel
- Dimensions: 40.6 cm × 32.5 cm (16.0 in × 12.8 in)
- Location: private collection

Love's Shadow is an 1867 painting by Pre-Raphaelite artist Frederick Sandys. It was modelled by actress Mary Emma Jones, Sandys' common-law wife. The figure is richly adorned and biting the blooms from some blue violets, which are a symbol of love and devotion in Victorian floriography.

The painting has been used as cover art in Christine Emba's 2022 novel Rethinking Sex: A Provocation, Chloe Michelle Howarth's 2025 novel Heap Earth Upon It, as well as in Kirsten King's 2026 novel A Good Person.
