= Anthony Sands =

British painter (1806–1883)

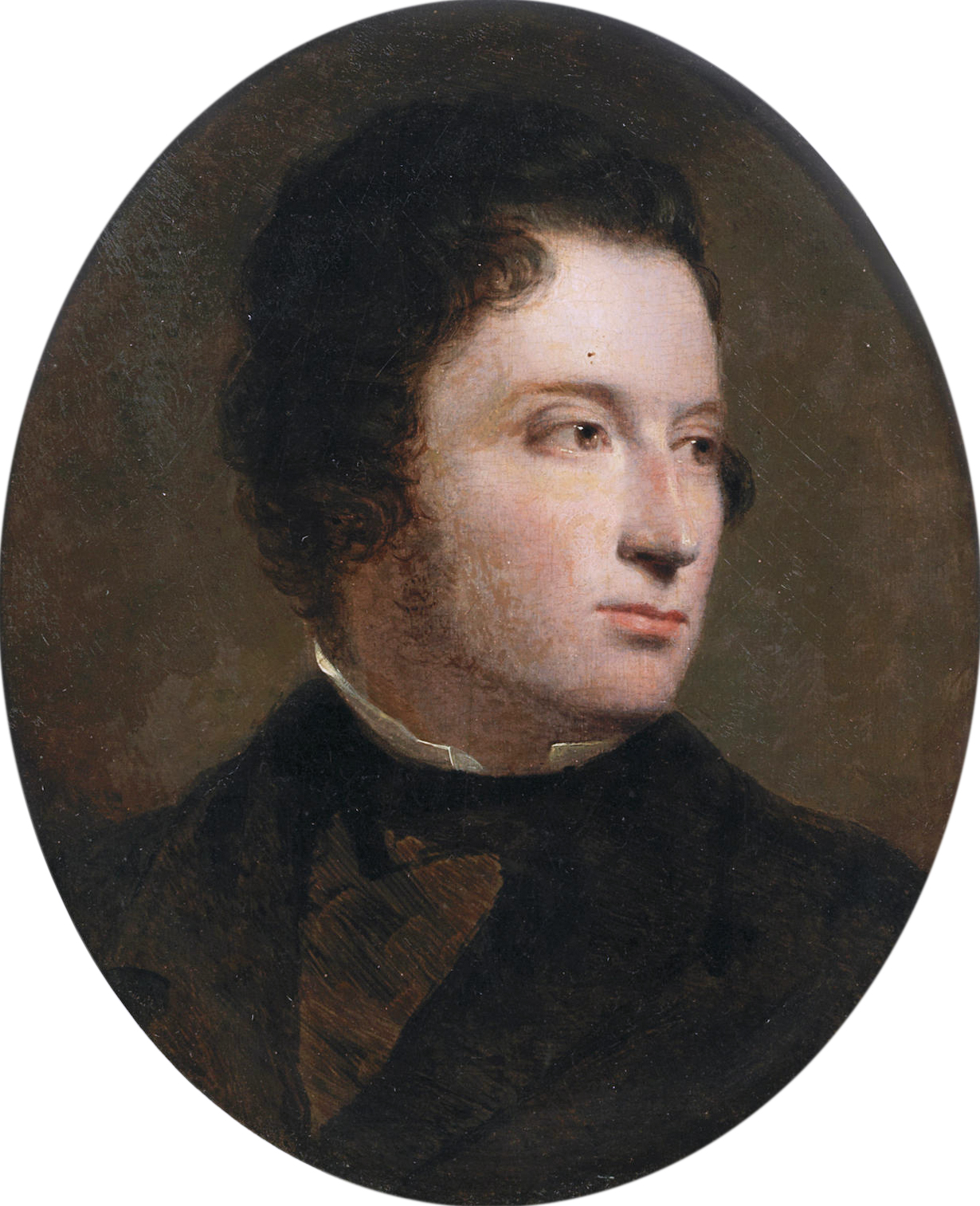
- Sands by Frederick Sandys (1849)
- Born: 1806
- Died: 1883 (aged 76–77)
- Occupation: Painter

Anthony Sands (1806–1883) was a British painter. He was the father of artist Frederick Sandys. Anthony was originally a dyer by profession, became a drawing-master in Norwich and subsequently a portrait and subject painter; examples of his work were in the Norwich Museum (No. 50) and in Mr. Russell Colman's collection at Norwich. He died in 1883.
