= List of Pre-Raphaelite paintings =

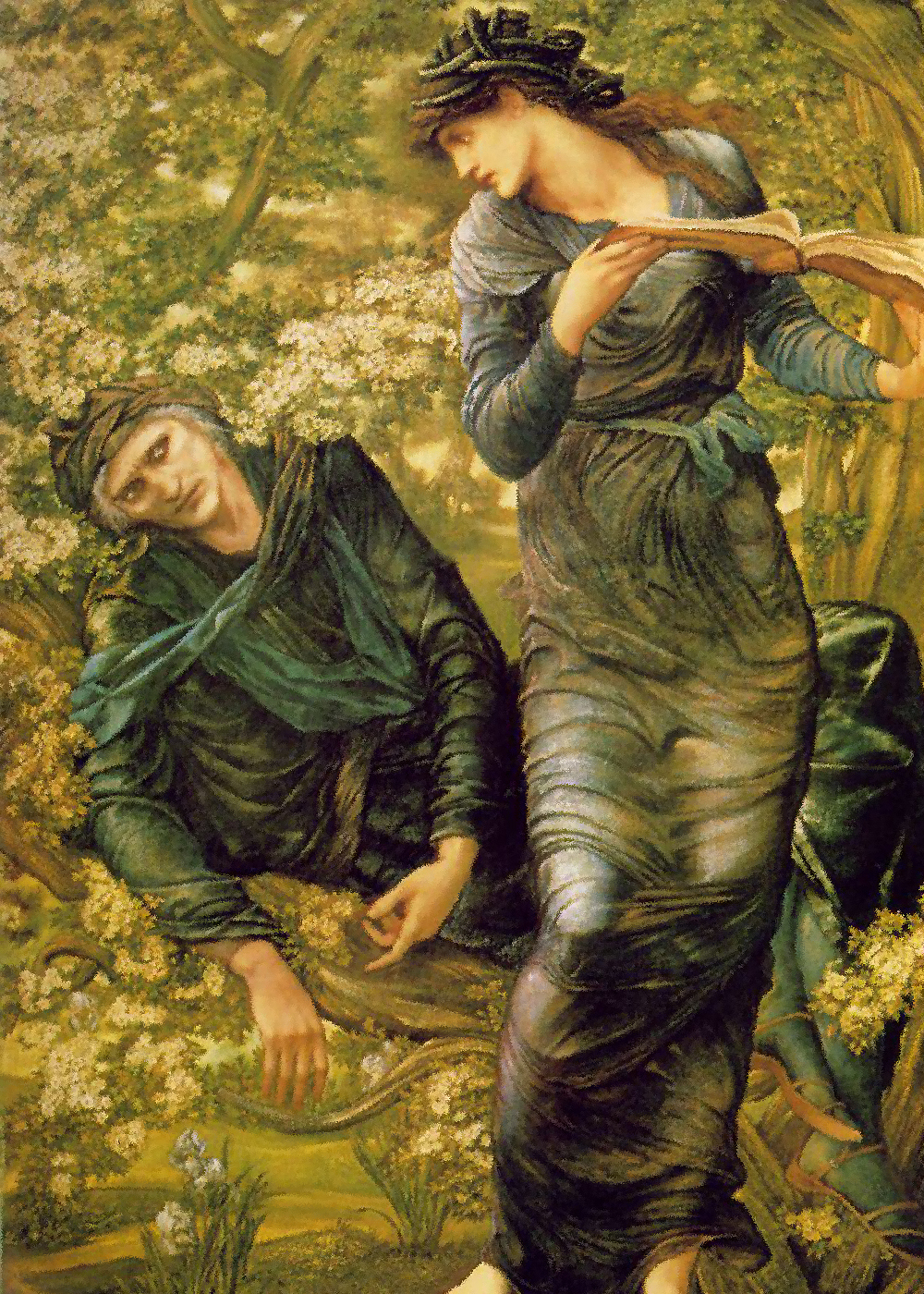
The Beguiling of Merlin, 1874 by Edward Burne-Jones, at the Lady Lever Art Gallery

This is a list of paintings produced by members of the Pre-Raphaelite Brotherhood and other artists associated with the Pre-Raphaelite style. The term "Pre-Raphaelite" is used here in a loose and inclusive fashion.

== PRB members ==
=== James Collinson ===
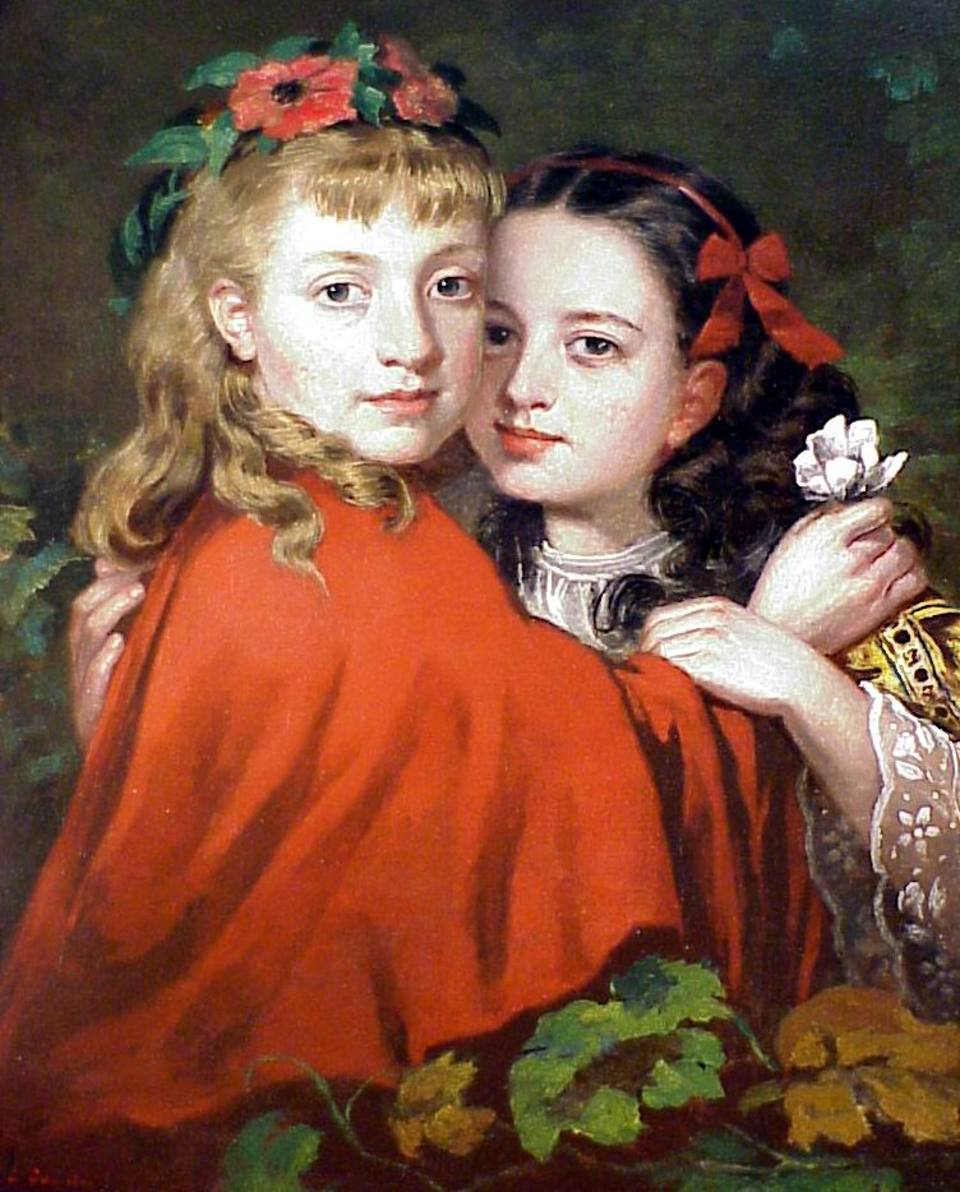
James Collinson – The Sisters, c. 1860

- The Renunciation of St. Elizabeth of Hungary (1850)
- Answering the Emigrant's Letter (1850)
- A Son of the Soil (1856)
- Home Again (1856)
- To Let, also known as The Landlady (1856)
- For Sale, also known as At the Bazaar (1857)
- The Sisters (c. 1860)
- Too Hot (1863)
- The Holy Family (1878)

=== William Holman Hunt ===
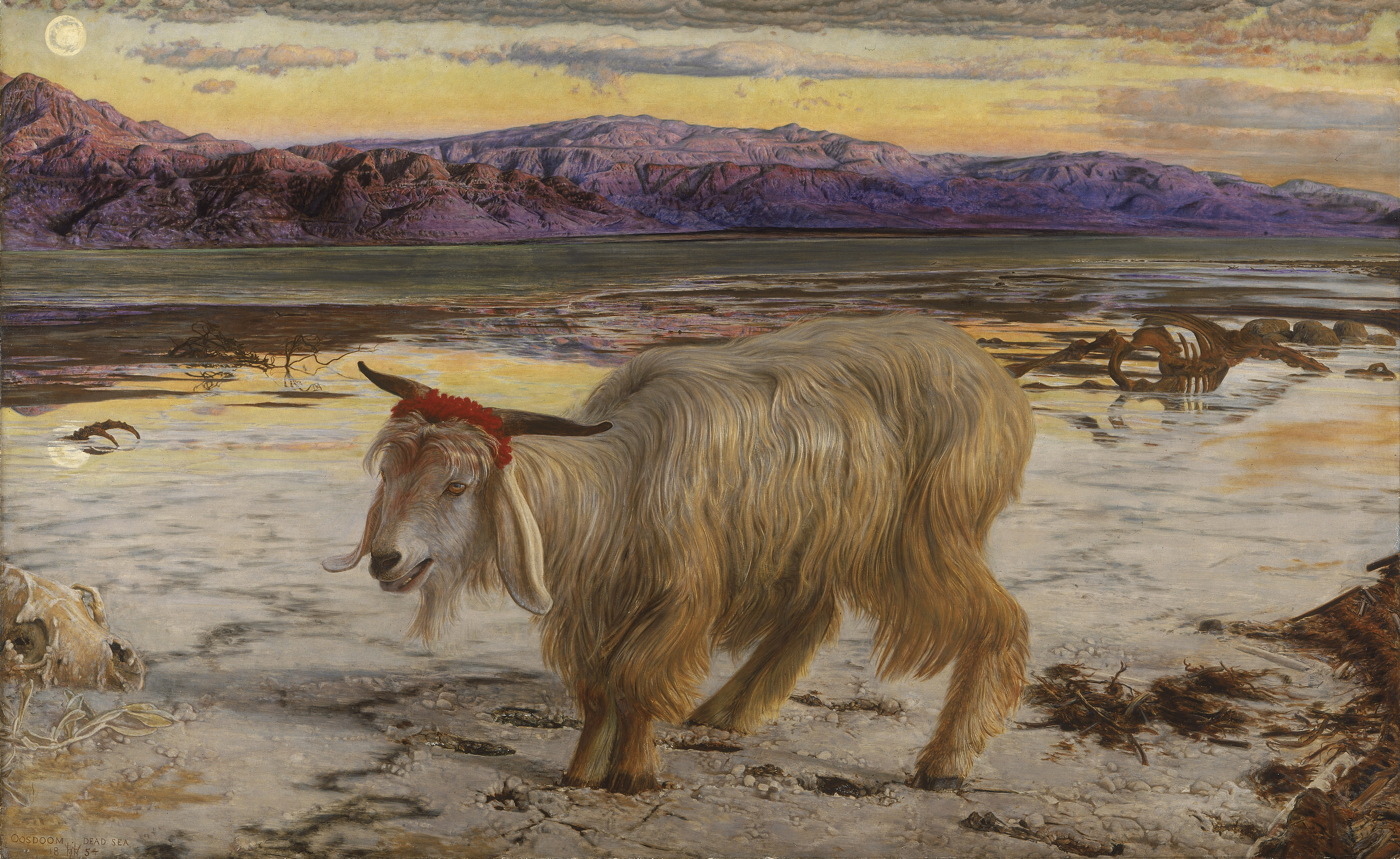
William Holman Hunt – The Scapegoat, 1854–1856

- Self-portrait at the Age of 14 (1841), Ashmolean Museum, Oxford
- Love at First Sight (1846)
- F. G. Stephens (1847), Tate Britain, London
- Christ and the Two Marys aka The Risen Christ with the Two Marys in the Garden of Joseph of Aramathea (1847 and 1897), Art Gallery of South Australia, Adelaide
- The Flight of Madeline and Porphyro during the drunkenness attending the revelry (The Eve of St. Agnes) (1848), Guildhall Art Gallery, London
- Rienzi vowing to obtain justice for the death of his young brother, slain in a skirmish between the Colonna and the Orsini factions (1848–1849), collection of Mrs. E. M. Clarke
- The Haunted Manor (1849), Tate Britain, London
- Cornfield at Ewell (1849), Tate Britain, London
- A Converted British Family Sheltering a Christian Missionary from the Persecution of the Druids (1849–50), Ashmolean Museum, Oxford
- Claudio and Isabella (1850–1853), Tate Britain, London
- The Hireling Shepherd (1851), Manchester Art Gallery
- The Awakening Conscience (1851–1853), Tate Britain, London
- Our English Coasts (1852), Tate Britain, London
- Dante Gabriel Rossetti (1853), Birmingham Museum and Art Gallery
- The Light of the World (1853–54), Keble College, Oxford
- The Great Pyramid (1854)
- The Finding of the Saviour in the Temple (1854–1860), Birmingham Museum & Art Gallery
- The Afterglow in Egypt (1854–63), Ashmolean Museum, Oxford
- The Scapegoat (1854–1856), Lady Lever Art Gallery, Port Sunlight
- The School-girl's Hymn (1858–59), Ashmolean Museum, Oxford
- London Bridge on the Night of the Marriage of the Prince and Princess of Wales (1863–64), Ashmolean Museum, Oxford
- The Festival of St. Swithin (The Dovecot) (1865–66), Ashmolean Museum, Oxford
- Il Dolce Far Niente (1866), Forbes Magazine Collection
- Isabella and the Pot of Basil (1868), Laing Art Gallery, Newcastle upon Tyne
- The Shadow of Death (1870–1873), Manchester Art Gallery
- The Ship (1875)
- The Plain of Esdralon from the Heights above Nazareth (1877), Ashmolean Museum, Oxford
- Sunset at Chimalditi
- The Triumph of the Innocents (1883–1884), Tate Britain, London
- The Bride of Bethlehem (1884–1885)
- The Lady of Shalott (with Edward Robert Hughes) (1886–1905), Ella Gallup Sumner and Mary Catlin Sumner Collection, Wadsworth Atheneum, Connecticut
- May Morning on Magdalen Tower (1888–1891), Lady Lever Art Gallery, Port Sunlight
- The Nile Postman (1892)
- The School of Nature (1893), Ponce Museum of Art, Puerto Rico
- Christ the Pilot (c. 1894)
- The Importunate Neighbour (1895)
- The Miracle of the Holy Fire (1892–1899), Fogg Art Museum, Harvard University
- The Beloved (1898)
- The Light of the World (with Edward Robert Hughes) (1900–1904), St Paul's Cathedral, London
- John Hunt, Tate Britain, London
- John Key, Tate Britain, London
- Amaryllis
- Bianca
- Master Hilary – The Tracer
- The King of Hearts
- The Tuscan Straw Plaiter
- The Apple Harvest – Valley of the Rhone
- Athens
- Nazareth
- H. B. Martineau
- Henry Wentworth Monk
- Thomas Fairbairn
- Sir Richard Owen
- Harold Rathbone
- Mrs. George Waugh
- Emily Waugh Hunt
- Fanny Waugh Hunt
- William Holman Hunt
- Christ amongst the Doctors
- Isabella

=== John Everett Millais ===
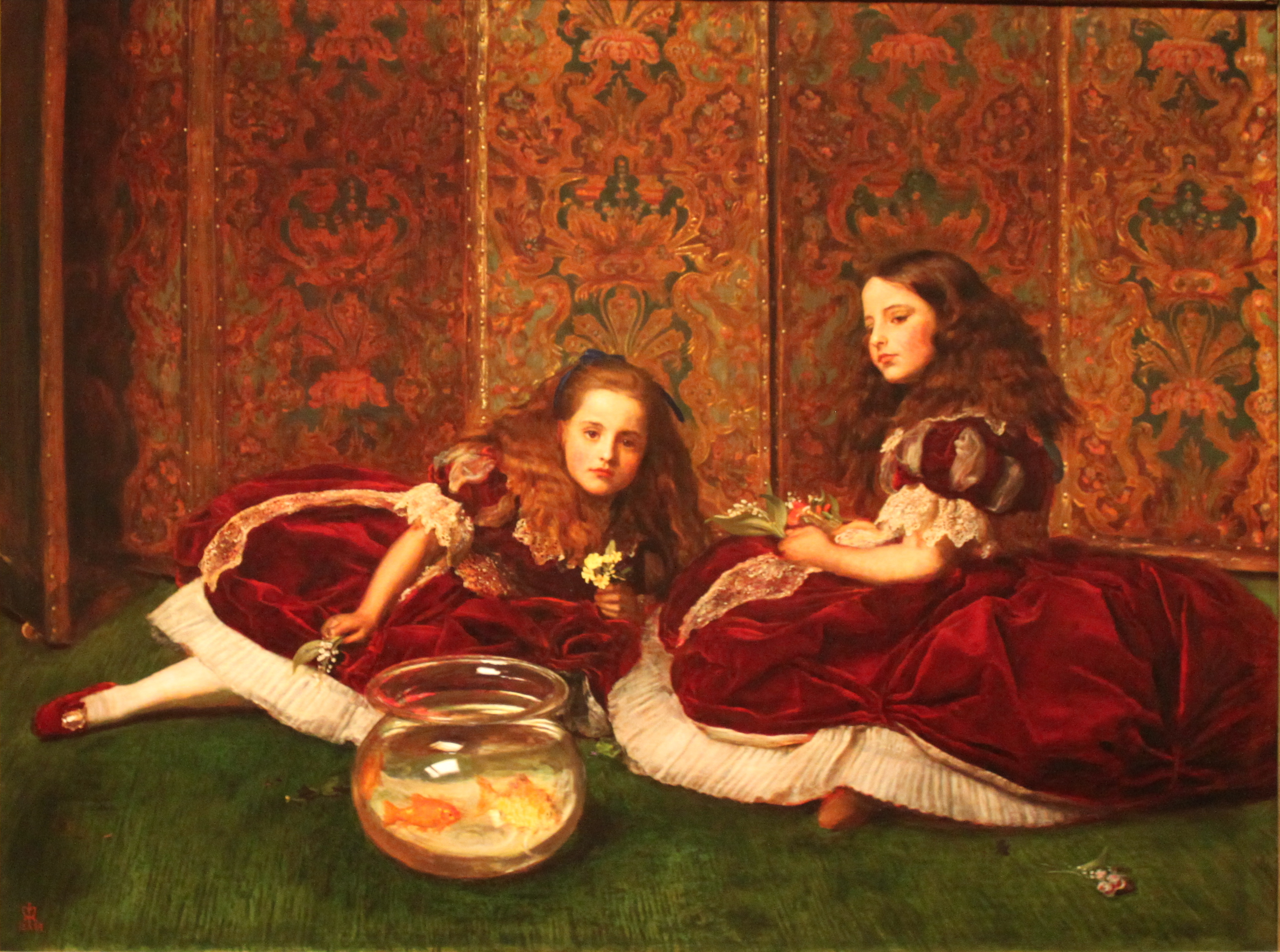
John Everett Millais, Leisure Hours, 1864, Detroit Institute of Arts

- Cymon and Iphigenia (1847–1848), Lady Lever Art Gallery, Liverpool
- The Death of Romeo and Juliet (c. 1848), Manchester Art Gallery
- Isabella (1848–1849), Walker Art Gallery, Liverpool
- Ferdinand Lured by Ariel (1849–1850), Private collection. An 1849 oil on canvas study of the same name is held at Sudley House, Liverpool
- Christ In The House Of His Parents (1850), Tate Britain, London
- The Return of the Dove to the Ark (1851), Ashmolean Museum, Oxford
- Mrs Coventry Patmore (1851) Fitzwilliam Museum, Cambridge
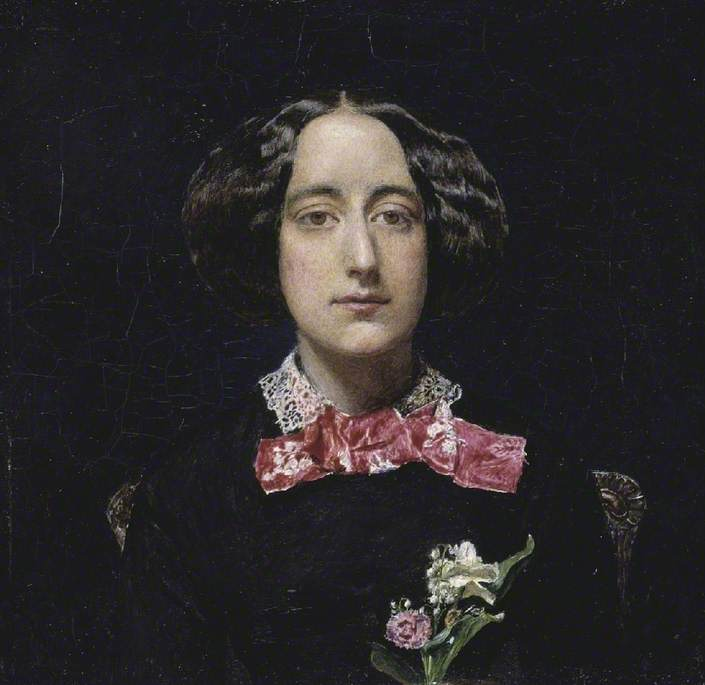
  John Everett Millais, Mrs Coventry Patmore (1851) Fitzwilliam Museum
- A Huguenot (1852), Makins Collection (private)
- Ophelia (1852), Tate Britain, London
- The Proscribed Royalist, 1651 (1853), Andrew Lloyd Webber Collection
- The Order of Release (1853), Tate Britain, London
- Portrait of Annie Miller (1854), private collection
- The Violet's Message (1854), private collection
- Wandering Thoughts (c. 1854), Manchester Art Gallery
- The Rescue (1855), National Gallery of Victoria, Melbourne
- Peace Concluded (1856), Minneapolis Institute of Arts
- Autumn Leaves (1856), Manchester Art Gallery
- The Blind Girl (1856), Birmingham Museum and Art Gallery
- L'Enfant du Régiment (1856), Yale Center for British Art, Connecticut
- A Dream of the Past: Sir Isumbras at the Ford (1857)
- The Escape of a Heretic, 1559 (1857), Museo de Arte de Ponce, Puerto Rico
- Only a Lock of Hair (1857–58), Manchester Art Gallery
- Spring, also known as Apple Blossoms, (1859), Lady Lever Art Gallery, Liverpool
- The Vale of Rest (1859), Tate Britain, London
- The Black Brunswicker (1860), Lady Lever Art Gallery, Liverpool
- The Ransom (1862), Getty Museum
- The Eve of St. Agnes (1863), Royal Collection at Clarence House, London
- Esther (1865), private collection
- Vanessa (1868), Sudley House, Liverpool
- Stella (1868), Manchester City Art Gallery
- The Boyhood of Raleigh (1870), Tate Gallery, London
- A Flood (1870), Manchester City Art Gallery
- Martyr of Solway (1871), Walker Art Gallery, Liverpool
- The Somnambulist (1871), Bolton Museum and Archive Services, Bolton, Greater Manchester
- Victory O Lord! (1871), Manchester City Art Gallery
- Winter Fuel (1873), Manchester City Art Gallery
- The North-West Passage (1874), Tate Gallery, London
- Mrs Leopold Reiss (1876), Manchester City Art Gallery
- The Two Princes Edward and Richard in the Tower (1876), Royal Holloway Collection, University of London, Egham
- Chill October (1879), The Artchive
- James Fraser (1880), Manchester City Art Gallery
- An Idyll of 1745 (1884), Lady Lever Art Gallery, Liverpool
- Bubbles (1886), owned by Unilever, on display at Lady Lever Art Gallery, Liverpool
- The Nest (1887), Lady Lever Art Gallery, Liverpool
- Dew-Drenched Furze (1890), private collection
- Lingering Autumn (1890), Lady Lever Art Gallery, Liverpool
- Glen Birnam (1891), Manchester City Art Gallery

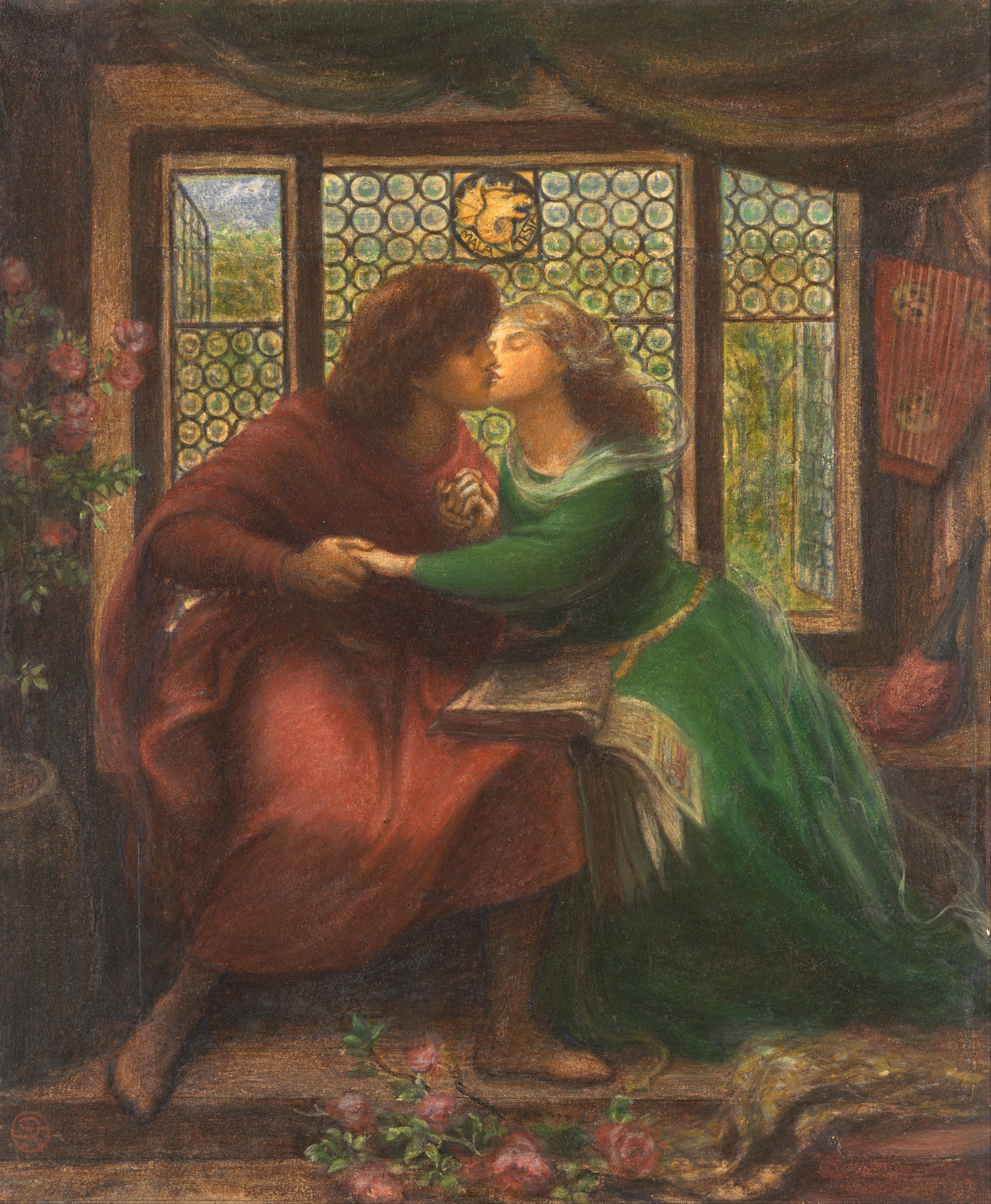
Dante Gabriel Rossetti – Paolo and Francesca da Rimini, 1867

=== Dante Gabriel Rossetti ===
- Ecce Ancilla Domini! or The Annunciation (1850), Tate Britain, London
- Found (1854), Delaware Art Museum, Wilmington
- Paolo and Francesca da Rimini (1855), Tate Britain, London
- Dante's Dream at the Time of the Death of Beatrice (1856), Tate Britain, London
- Bocca Baciata (1860), Museum of Fine Arts, Boston
- Beata Beatrix (1864), Tate Britain, London
- Venus Verticordia (1864–1868), Russell-Cotes Art Gallery & Museum, Bournemouth
- The Beloved or The Bride or The King's Daughter (1865–66, 1873), Tate Britain, London
- Monna Vanna or Belcolore (1866), Tate Britain, London
- Sibylla Palmifera or Venus Palmifera (1866–1870), Lady Lever Art Gallery, Port Sunlight
- Lady Lilith (1867), Metropolitan Museum of Art, New York
- Lady Lilith (1868), Delaware Art Museum, Wilmington
- Pia de' Tolomei (c. 1868), Spencer Museum of Art, Kansas
- Silence (1870), Brooklyn Museum of Art, New York
- Dante's Dream at the Time of the Death of Beatrice (1869–1871), Walker Art Gallery, Liverpool
- Water Willow (1871), Delaware Art Museum, Wilmington
- The Bower Meadow (1872), Manchester Art Gallery.
- Veronica Veronese (1872), Delaware Art Museum, Wilmington
- La Ghirlandata (1873), Guildhall Art Gallery, London
- Proserpine (1874), Tate Britain, London.
- Damsel of the Sanct Grael (1874), collection of Andrew Lloyd Webber
- Roman Widow or Dîs Manibus (1874), Museo de Arte de Ponce, Puerto Rico
- La Bella Mano (1875), Delaware Art Museum, Wilmington
- Astarte Syriaca or Venus Astarte (1876–1877), Manchester Art Gallery
- Mnemosyne or Lamp of Memory or Ricordanza (1876–1881), Delaware Art Museum, Wilmington
- A Sea–Spell (1877), Fogg Museum of Art, Harvard University
- A Vision of Fiammetta (1878), collection of Lord Lloyd-Webber
- The Day Dream or Monna Primavera (1880), Victoria and Albert Museum, London
- The Blessed Damozel (1875–1881), Lady Lever Art Gallery, Port Sunlight
- Proserpine (1882), Birmingham Museums & Art Gallery, Birmingham

== Other major artists ==
=== Ford Madox Brown ===
- Manfred on the Jungfrau (1840–1861), Manchester Art Gallery
- Take your Son, Sir! (1851–1892, unfinished), Tate Britain, London
- Work (1852–1865), finished painting (1865) Manchester Art Gallery; full study (1863) in Birmingham Museum & Art Gallery
- The Last of England (1855), Birmingham Museum & Art Gallery; further oil version (1860) in the Fitzwilliam Museum, Cambridge; watercolour (1864–1865) in Tate Britain, London
- Stages of Cruelty (1856–1890), Manchester Art Gallery; 1856 watercolour sketch in Tate Britain, London
- Cromwell on his Farm (1873–1874), Lady Lever Art Gallery, Liverpool
- Cromwell, Protector of the Vaudois (1877), Manchester Art Gallery

=== Edward Burne-Jones ===
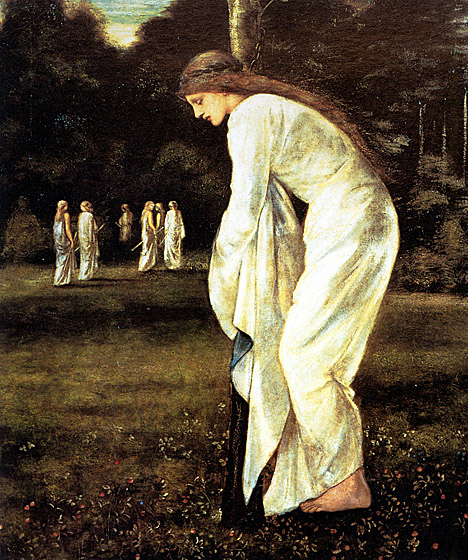
Edward Burne-Jones, The Princess Tied to the Tree 1866

- The Merciful Knight (1863), Birmingham Museum & Art Gallery, Birmingham
- The Beguiling of Merlin (1872–1877), Lady Lever Art Gallery, Port Sunlight
- The Golden Stairs (1880), Tate Britain, London
- The Last Sleep of Arthur in Avalon (1881), Museo de Arte de Ponce, Puerto Rico
- The Mill (1882), Victoria and Albert Museum, London
- Georgiana Burne-Jones (1883), private collection (?)
- King Cophetua and the Beggar Maid (painting) (1884), Tate Britain, London
- The Garden of Pan (c. 1886), National Gallery of Victoria, Melbourne
- The Star of Bethlehem (1887–1891), Birmingham Museum & Art Gallery, Birmingham
- The Nativity (1888), Carnegie Museum of Art, Pittsburgh
- Sponsa de Libano or The Bride of Lebanon (1891), Walker Art Gallery, Liverpool
- Hope (1896), Museum of Fine Arts, Boston

=== Arthur Hughes ===
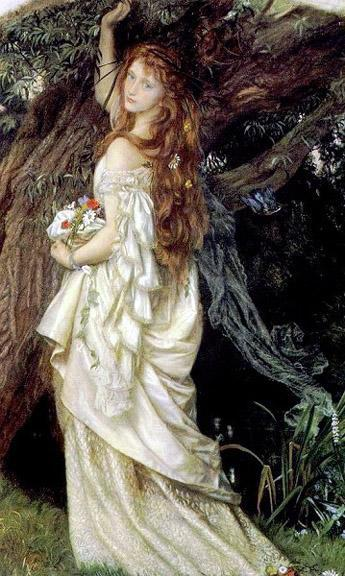
Arthur Hughes – Ophelia, 1863–64

- Ophelia (1851–1853)
- April Love (1855–1856), Tate Britain, London
- Home From the Sea (1856–57)
- The Long Engagement (1859), Birmingham Museum and Art Gallery
- Mariana at the window (c. 1860s)
- Knight of the Sun (c. 1861)
- Home from Sea (1862), Ashmolean Museum, Oxford
- La Belle Dame Sans Merci (1861–1863)
- Ophelia and He Will Not Come Again (1863–1864)
- The Lady of Shalott (c. 1863)
- Beauty and the Beast (1863–1865)
- A Music Party (1864)
- In the Grass (c. 1864–1865), Sheffield Galleries and Museums Trust
- Good Night (1865–1866)
- Sir Galahad (1870), Walker Art Gallery, Liverpool
- Endymion (1868–1870)
- The Enchantress (c. 1870–1874)
- The Lady of Shalott (c. 1872–1873)
- The Convent Boat (1874)
- A Christmas Carol at Bracken Dene (1878–79)
- The Property Room (1879)
- The Heavenly Stair (c. 1887–1888)
- Sir Galahad (c. 1894)
- The Rescue (1907–1908)
- Overthrowing of the Rusty Knight (c. 1908)
- Wonderland (1912)
- Picking up seaweed
- Returning Home
- The King's Orchard
- Will o' the Wisp

== Associated artists ==
=== George Price Boyce ===
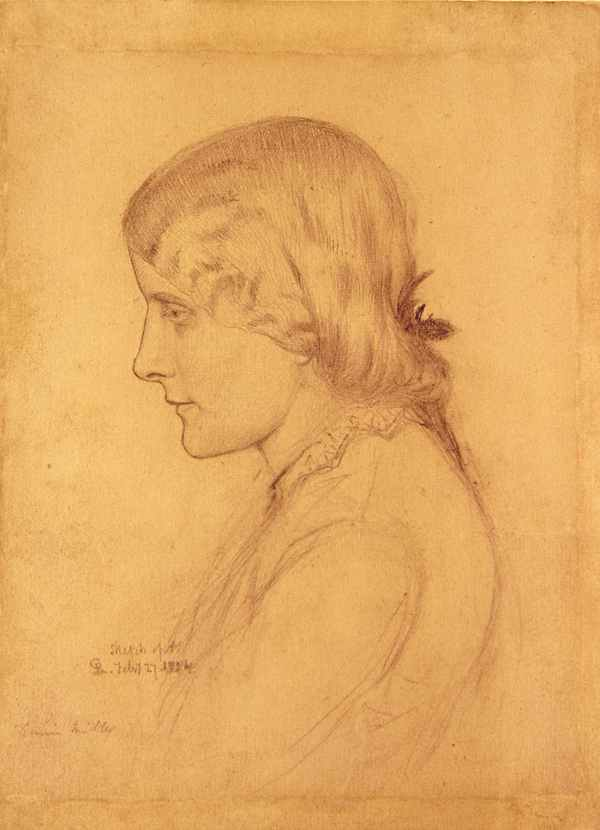
George Price Boyce – A Portrait of Annie Miller, 1854

- Crypt of St. Nicolas Giornico, Canton Ticino Switzerland (1856)
- Outside the church of San Nicolo da Mira, Giornico (1856)
- On the East Lynn, Middleham, North Devon (1858)
- Streatley Mill at Sunset (1859)
- From the Garden of Sherford Cottage, Bromyard (c. 1860)
- Autumn in the Welsh Hills (1860), Berger Collection Educational Trust, Denver Art Museum
- Pyramids and Sphinx of Ghizeh (1861)
- The Nile at Gizeh (1861)
- At Binsey, near Oxford (1862), Cecil Higgins Art Gallery, Bedford
- Newcastle from the Rabbit Banks, Gateshead on Tyne (1864)
- Sandpit near Abinger, Surrey (1866–1867), Walker Art Gallery, London
- Abinger Mill-Pond, Surrey - Morning in Late Autumn (1866–1867)
- Study of Ellen Smith, head & shoulders (c. 1868)
- Pensosa d'Altrui (1869)
- The Royal Oak, Bettws-y-Coed
- Beeches
- Timber Yard, Chiddingstone
- East-end of Edward Confessor's Chapel, Westminster

=== John Brett ===
- Emily, Mrs. Coventry Patmore (pre-1856) Ashmolean Museum, Oxford. portraying Emily Augusta Patmore.
- The Glacier of Rosenlaui (1856), Tate Britain, London
- The Stonebreaker (1857–1858), Walker Art Gallery, Liverpool
- Val d'Aosta (1858)
- Florence from Bellosguardo (1863), Tate Britain, London
- Massa, Bay of Naples (1864), Indianapolis Museum of Art
- Lady with a Dove: Madame Loeser (1864), Tate Britain, London
- Bonchurch Downs (1865), Metropolitan Museum of Art, New York
- The British Channel Seen from the Dorsetshire Cliffs (1871), Tate Britain, London
- Rocks: Scilly (1873), Walker Art Gallery, Liverpool
- Britannia's Realm (1880), Tate Britain, London
- From the Balcony, Cliff Cottage, Lee (1896)
- Trevose Head (1897), Walker Art Gallery, Liverpool

=== James Campbell ===
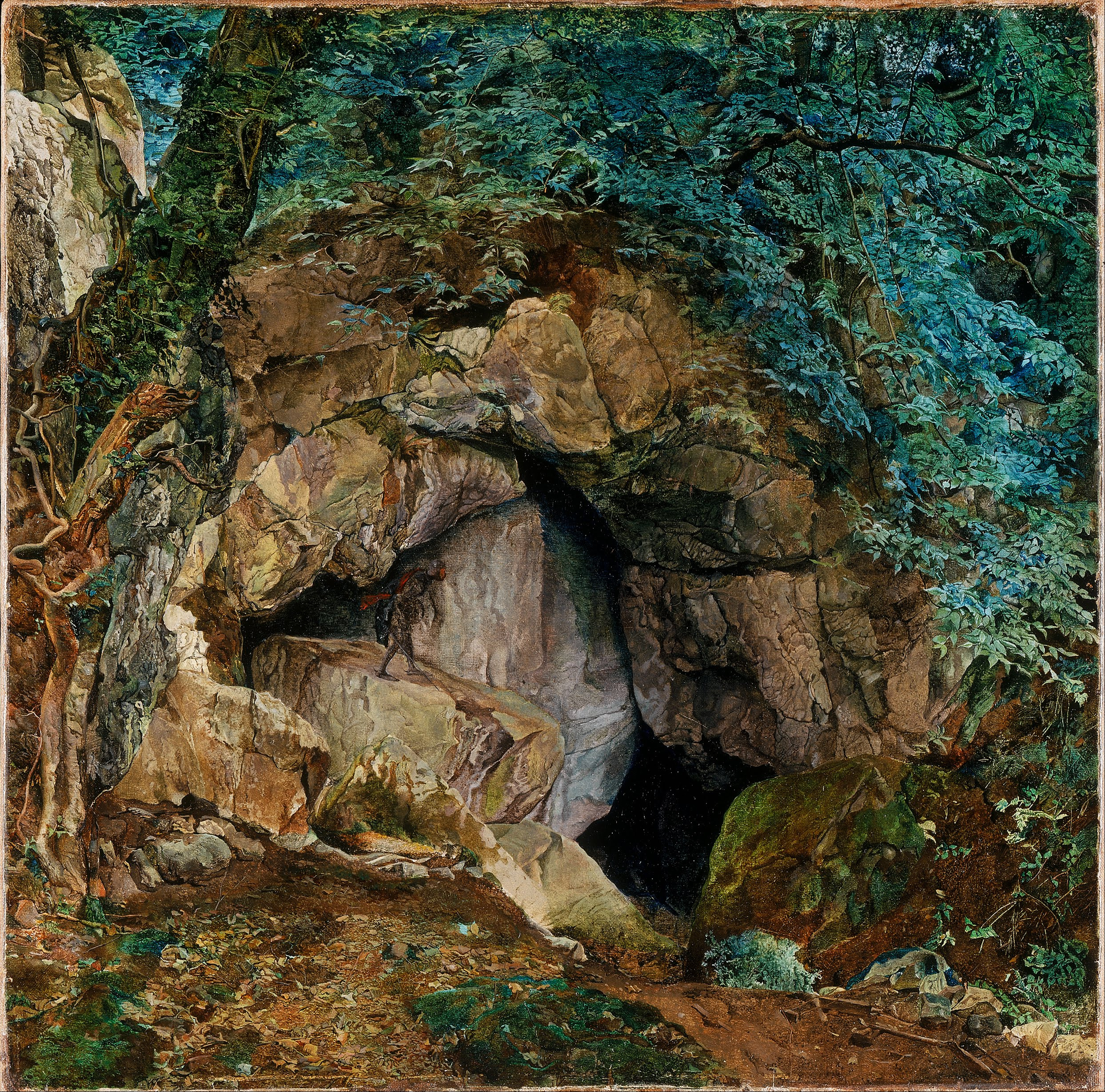
James Campbell – The Dragon’s Den, 1854

- The Lollipop (1855), Tate Britain, London
- Girl with Jug of Ale and Pipes (1856), Walker Art Gallery, Liverpool
- The Dragon's Den (1854), Walker Art Gallery, Liverpool
- Waiting for Legal Advice (1857), Walker Art Gallery, Liverpool
- The Wife's Remonstrance (1857–1858), Birmingham Museum & Art Gallery
- Our Village Clockmaker Solving a Problem (1859)
- News from My Lad (1859), Walker Art Gallery, Liverpool
- Twilight - Trudging Homewards
- Home and Rest

=== John Collier ===
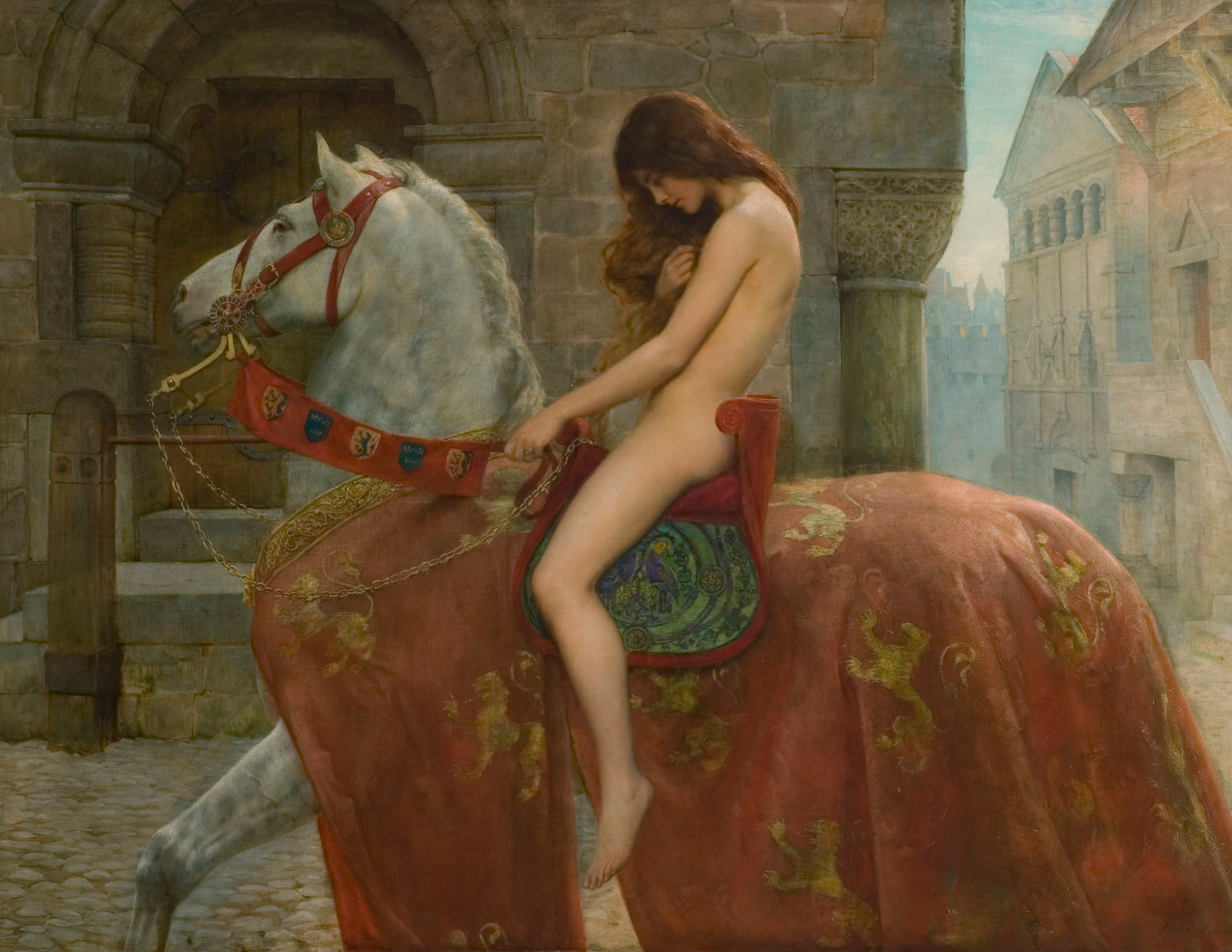
John Collier – Lady Godiva (1897), Herbert Art Gallery & Museum

- The Artist's Wife (1880)
- Charles Darwin (1881, 1883)
- Last Voyage of Henry Hudson (1881), Tate Britain, London
- Clytemnestra after the Murder (1882), Guildhall Art Gallery, London
- The Pharaoh's Handmaidens (1883), private collection
- Circe (1885)
- The Priestess of Bacchus (1885–1889)
- Lilith (1887), Atkinson Art Gallery and Library, Southport
- The Death of Cleopatra, Gallery Oldham (1890)
- The Water Baby (1890)
- Horace and Lydia (1890)
- Priestess of Delphi (1891), Art Gallery of South Australia, Adelaide, Australia
- In the Forest of Arden (1892)
- A Glass of Wine with Caesar Borgia (1893)
- Lady Hallé (1895)
- The Laboratory (1895), private collection
- The Death of Albine (1895)
- Pope Urban VI (1896)
- Queen Guinevre's Maying (1897), Cartwright Hall, Bradford
- Lady Godiva (1897), Herbert Art Gallery & Museum, Coventry
- In the Venusberg (1901), version on canvas at the Atkinson Art Gallery and Library, Southport; version on board in a private collection
- The Plague (1902)
- Lewis Waller as Monsieur Beaucaire (1903)
- The Prodigal Daughter (1903)
- The Sinner (1904), Victoria Art Gallery, Bath
- Sentence of Death (1908)
- The Land Baby (1909)
- The White Devil (1909)
- Eve (1911)
- Mrs Campbell McInnes (1912), National Gallery of Victoria, Melbourne, Australia
- The Grand Lady (1920)
- The Water Nymph (1923)
- Mrs Huxley (1927–1928), Tate Britain, London
- Portrait of the Artist's Daughter (1929)
- Shopping for Silks
- Sleeping Beauty
- Spring
- Ellen Terry
- Hetty Sorrell
- The Brotherhood of Man, Potteries Museum & Art Gallery, Stoke-on-Trent
- Reclining Woman, private collection

=== Charles Allston Collins ===
- Berengaria's Alarm (1850)
- Convent Thoughts (1851)
- May, in the Regent's Park (1851)
- The Devout Childhood of St Elizabeth of Hungary

=== Frank Cadogan Cowper ===
- Rapunzel (1900)
- Hamlet - The churchyard scene (1902)
- Francis of Assisi and the Heavenly Melody (1904)
- St Agnes in Prison Receiving from Heaven the Shining White Garment (1905)
- La Belle Dame Sans Merci (1905)
- Molly, Duchess of Nona (1905)
- Mariana in the South (1906)
- Vanity (1907)
- How the Devil, Disguised (1907)
- Erasmus and Thomas More Visit the Children of Henry VII at Greenwich (1908)
- Lucretia Borgia Reigns in the Vatican in the Absence of Pope Alexander VI (1908–1914)
- Venetian Ladies Listening to the Serenade (1909)
- The Love Letter (1911)
- The Hon. Mrs. Hanbury-Tracy (1914)
- Our Lady of the Fruits of the Earth (1917)
- The Blue Bird (1918)
- The Cathedral Scene from 'Faust': Margaret tormented by the Evil Spirit (1919)
- Vanity (1919)
- Fair Rosamund and Eleanor (1920)
- The Damsel of the Lake (1924)
- La Belle Dame Sans Merci (1926)
- Titania Sleeps (1928)
- Sir Havilland De Sausmarez (1930)
- Mrs. Albert S. Kerry (1930)
- Pamela, Daughter of Lieut. Col. M. F. Halford (1930)
- La Belle Dame Sans Merci (1946)
- The Ugly Duckling (1950)
- The Legend of Sir Perceval (1952–1953)
- The Four Queens Find Lancelot Sleeping (1954)
- Elizabeth, Daughter of Major General F V B Willis (1955)
- The Golden Bowl (1956)
- Self-Portrait (1957)
- The Patient Griselda
- Portrait of Professor Rey
- Lancelot Slays the Caitiff Knight Sir Tarquin
- Eve

=== William Davis ===
- Bidston Marsh at Wallasey (1853)
- Shotwick Church, Cheshire (1855)
- Early Spring Evening, Cheshire (1855)
- A Dark Roan Bull (1859)
- Hale, Lancashire (c. 1860), Walker Art Gallery, Liverpool
- View from Bidston Hill (c. 1865), Walker Art Gallery, Liverpool
- A Day's Sport at Bidston Hill (c. 1865), Tate Britain, London
- Carving His Name
- A Field of Corn
- Wallasey Mill, Cheshire

=== Walter Howell Deverell ===
- A Pet (1853)
- The Grey Parrot (1852–1853)
- The Mock Marriage of Orlando and Rosalind (1853)
- Twelfth Night, Act II, Scene IV (1850)

=== Frank Bernard Dicksee ===
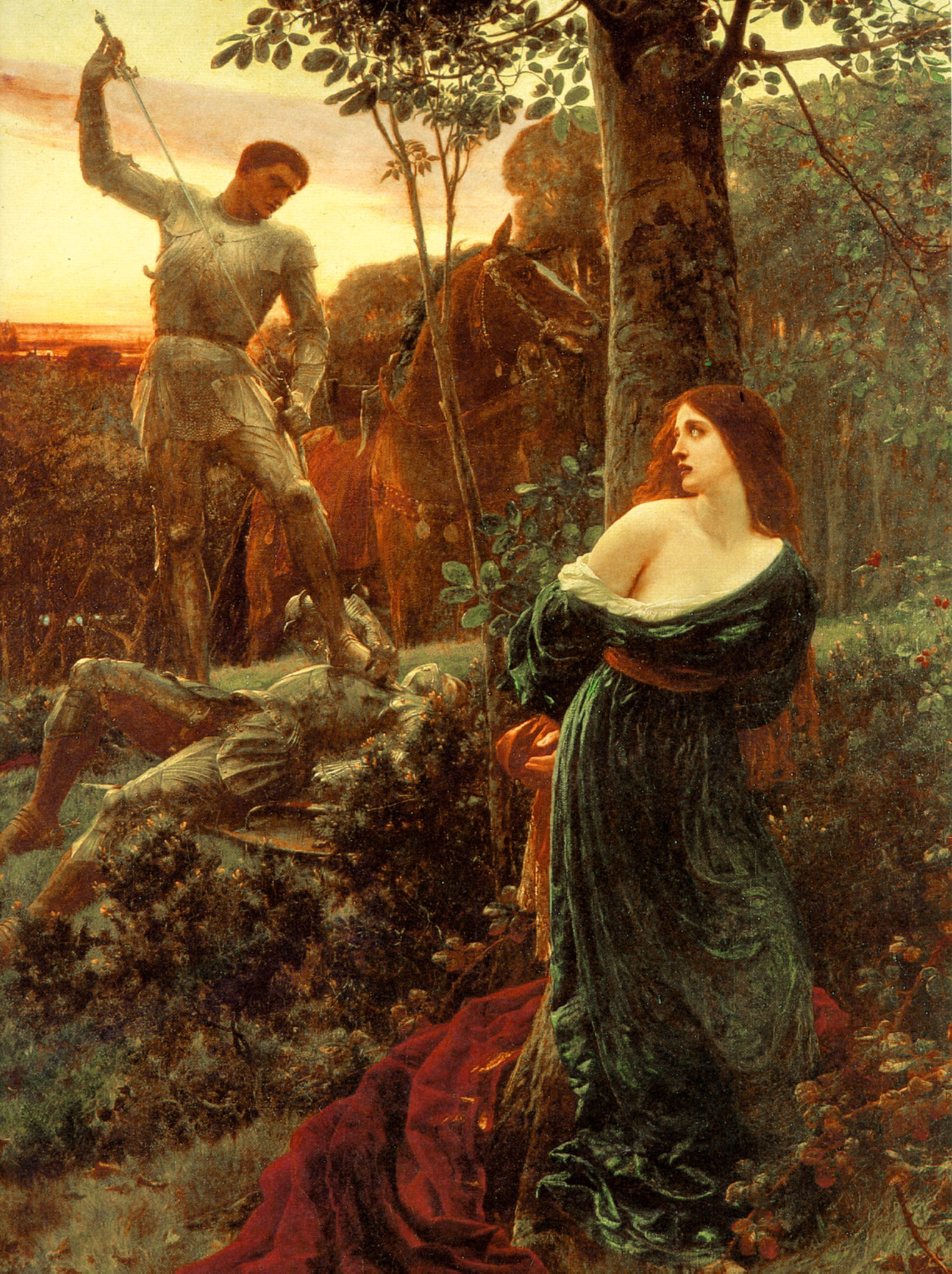
Frank Bernard Dicksee – Chivalry, 1885

- Elopement (1872)
- Harmony (1877)
- Miranda (1878)
- The Symbol (1881)
- The Foolish Virgins (1883)
- Spring Maiden (1884)
- Romeo and Juliet (1884)
- Chivalry (1885)
- Hesperia (1887)
- Portrait of a Woman (1887)
- Beatrice (1888)
- The Crisis (1891)
- Startled (1892)
- Leila (1892)
- Passion (1892)
- Funeral of a Viking (1893)
- Paolo and Francesca (1894)
- The Magic Crystal (1894)
- The Mirror (1896)
- The Confession (1896)
- Dawn (1897)
- An Offering (1898)
- Portrait of a Lady (c. 1900)
- The Two Crowns (1900)
- Yseult (1901)
- La Belle Dame Sans Merci (1903)
- The Mother (1907)
- Flowers of June (1909)
- The Shadowed Face (1909)
- Portrait of Maude Moore (1913)
- Camille, Daughter of Sutton Palmer, Esq (1914)
- Dorothy (1917)
- Portrait of Agnes Mallam (Mrs Edward Foster) (1921)
- The End of the Quest (1921)
- Mrs. Norman Holbrook (1924)
- Portrait of Elsa (1927)
- Sylvia
- Portrait of Dora
- Resurgam
- Reverie
- The Duet
- The Emblem
- The Reverie
- Cleopatra

=== William Gale ===
- Entry of Christ into Jerusalem

=== Edward Robert Hughes ===
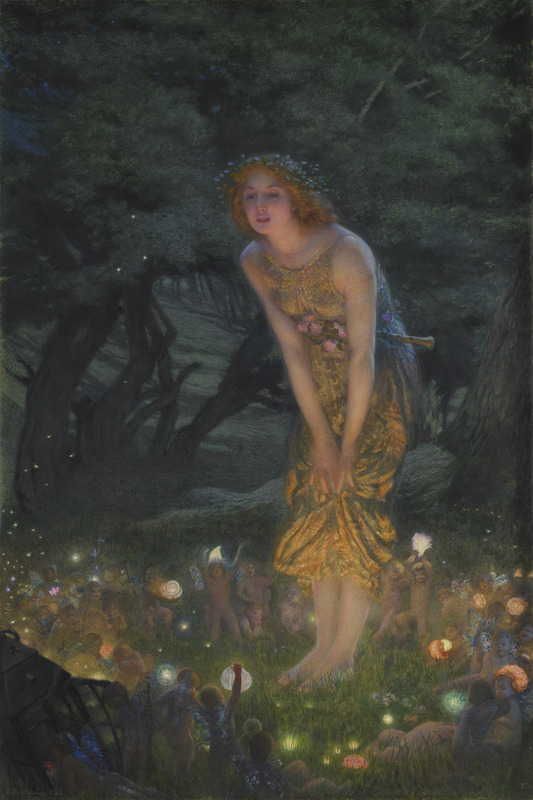
Edward Robert Hughes – Midsummer Eve, 1908

=== John Lee ===
- Going to Market (1860), Walker Art Gallery, Liverpool
- Sweethearts and Wives (1860), Walker Art Gallery, Liverpool

=== Edmund Blair Leighton ===
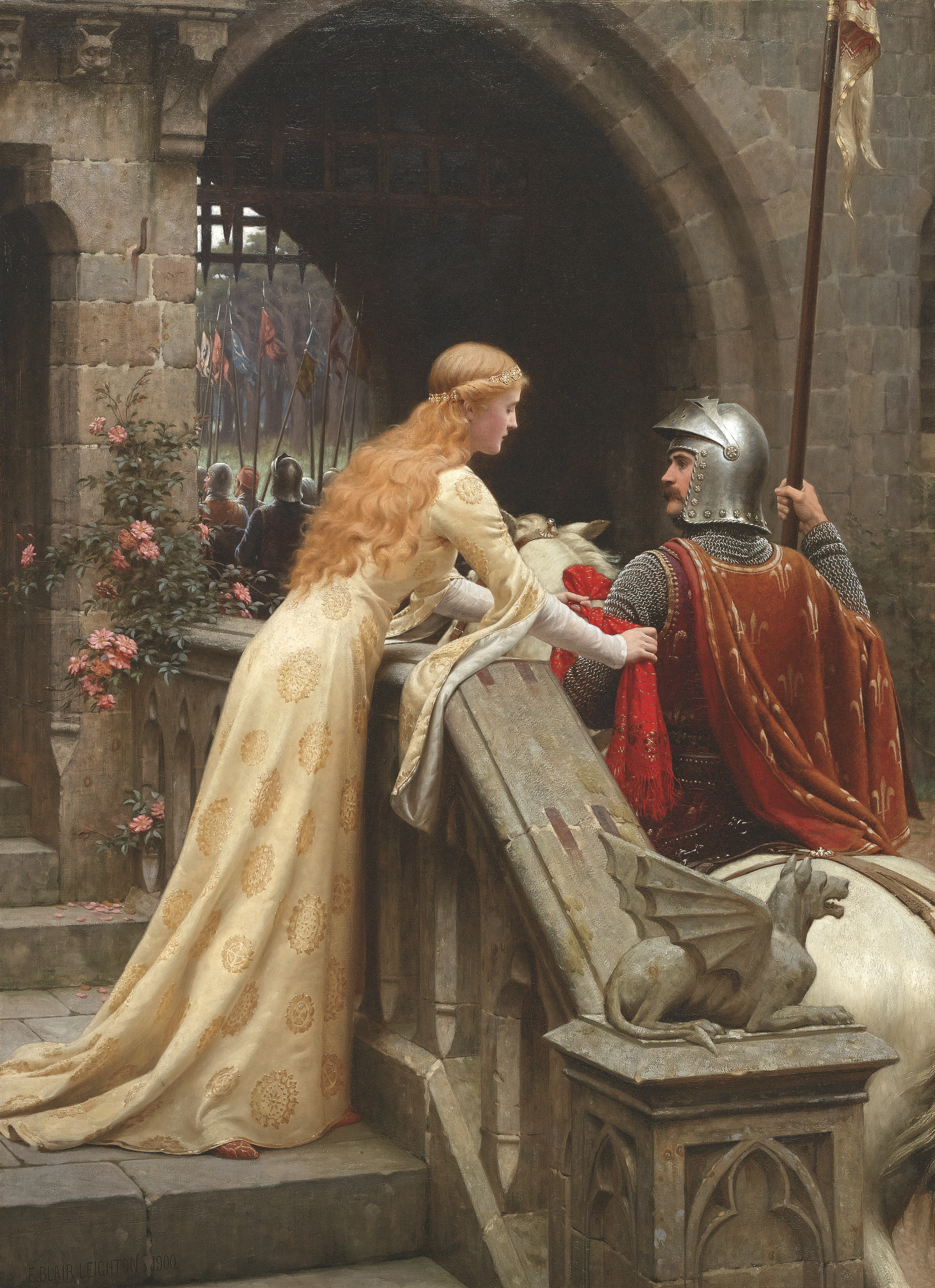
Edmund Leighton – God Speed, 1900

Paintings with articles:

- In Time of Peril (1897)
- God Speed (1900)
- The End of the Song (1902)
- Alain Chartier (1903)
- The Hostage (1912)

=== Evelyn De Morgan ===
Paintings with articles:

- Aurora Triumphans (1877–1878 or c. 1886)
- Night and Sleep (1878)
- Flora (1894)
- Eos (1895)
- Helen of Troy (1898)
- The Gilded Cage (1901–1902 or 1908)
- The Love Potion (1903)

=== Joseph Noel Paton ===
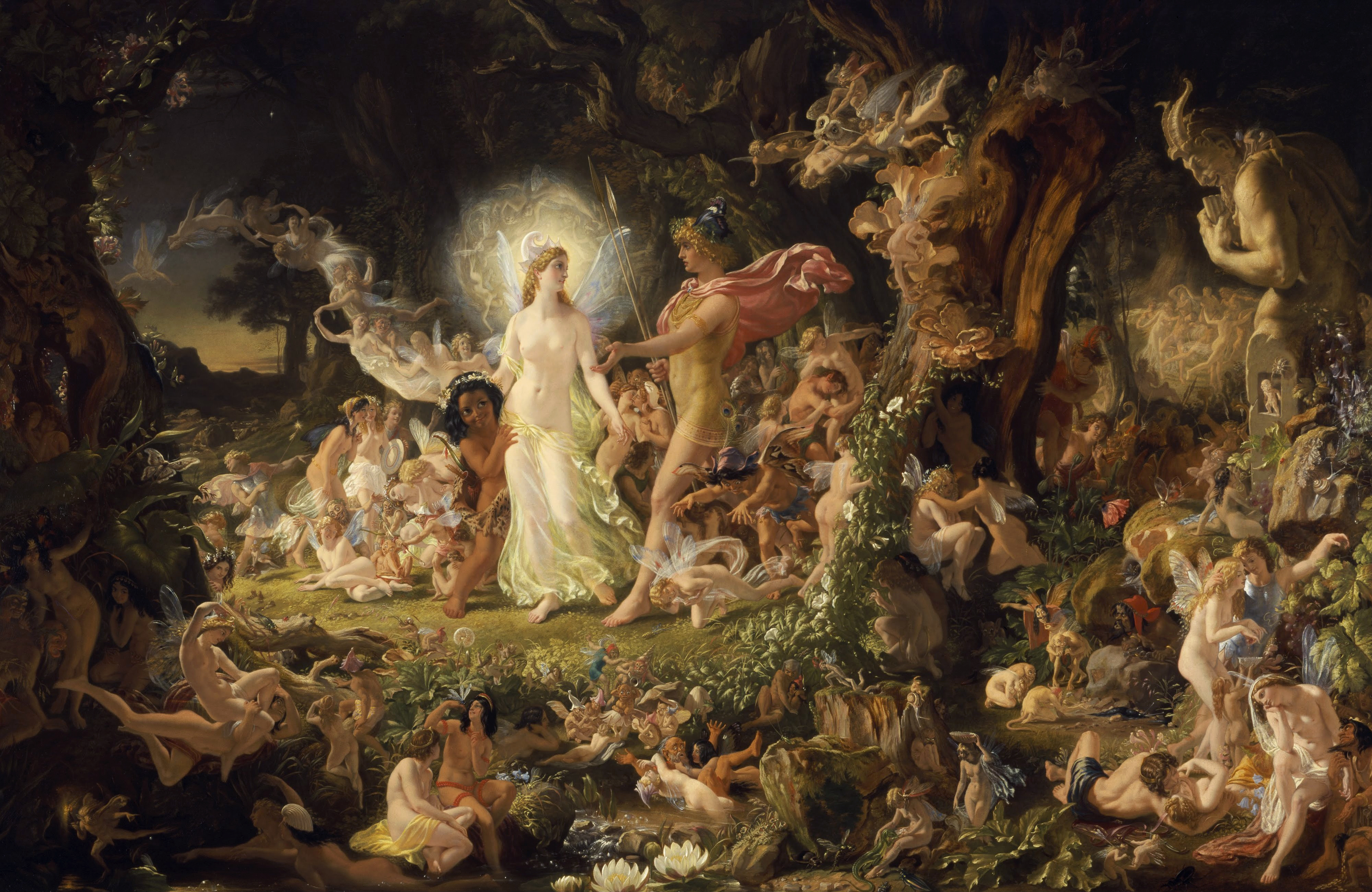
Sir Joseph Noel Paton – The Quarrel of Oberon and Titania, 1849

- The Quarrel of Oberon and Titania (1849)
- The Reconciliation of Oberon and Titania (1847)
- The Pursuit of Pleasure (1855)
- The Bluidie Tryst (1855)
- Hesperus (1857)
- In Memoriam (1858)
- Oskold and the Ell-maids (1874)
- In Die Malo (1882)
- How an Angel rowed Sir Galahad across the Dern Mere (1888)
- Oberon and the Mermaid (1888)
- Warriors
- Sir Galahad
- Lux in Tenebris (1879)

=== Frederick Sandys ===
(Anthony Frederick Augustus Sandys)

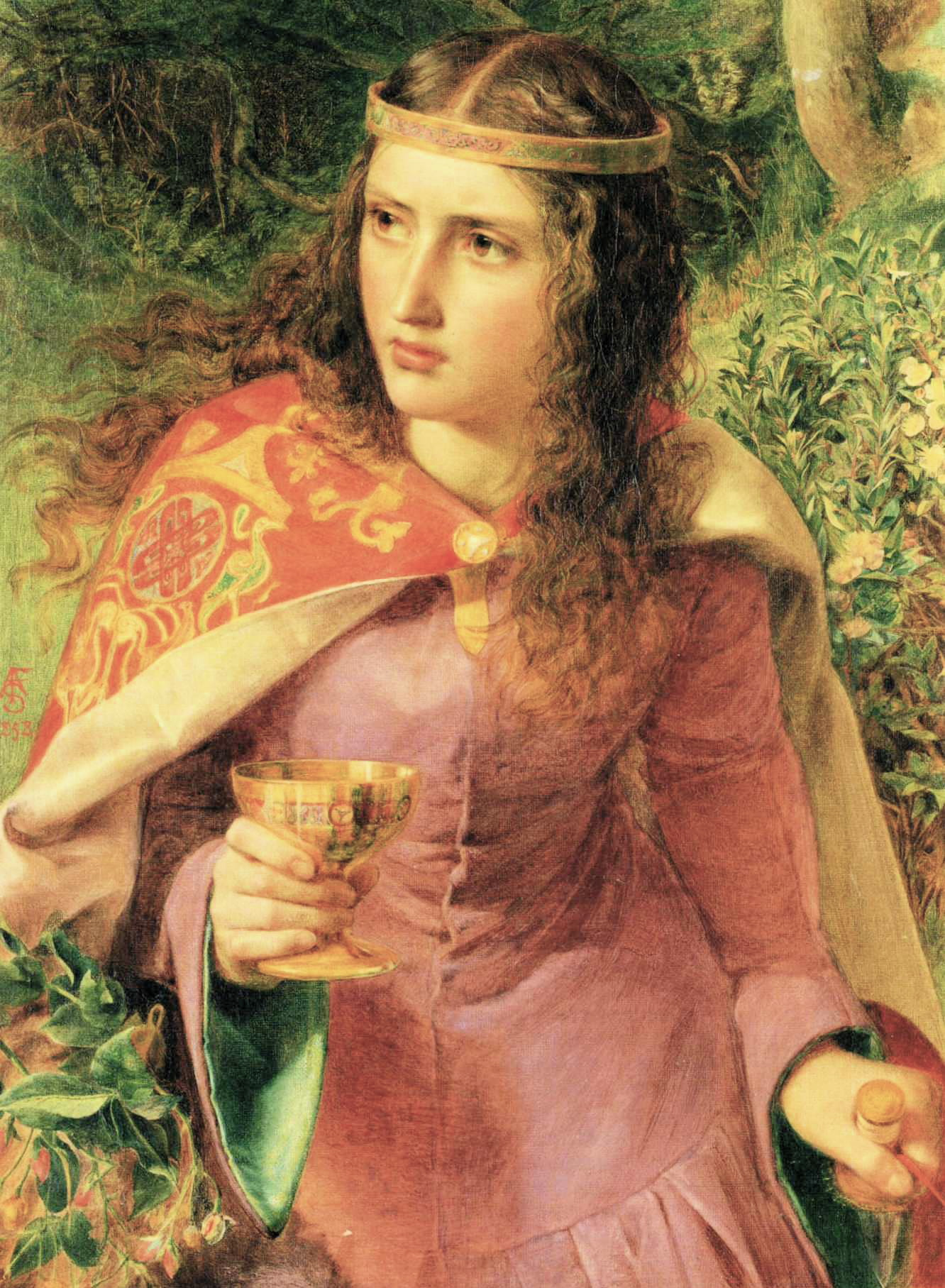
Frederick Sandys – Queen Eleanor, 1858

- Mrs Sandys, the artist's mother (late 1840s), Fitzwilliam Museum, Cambridge
- Self-Portrait in a broad-brimmed Hat (1848), private collection
- Study of Miss Sandys (1849), private collection
- Portrait of a Young Man (before 1850), Fitzwilliam Museum, Cambridge
- Emma Sandys, the artist's sister (1853–1855), Fitzwilliam Museum, Cambridge
- Queen Eleanor (1858), National Museum of Wales
- Mary Magdalene (1858–1860), Delaware Art Museum, Wilmington; listed at Bridgeman Art Library
- Portrait of Adelaide Mary, Mrs Philip Bedingfeld (1859), Norwich Castle Museum and Art Gallery
- Portrait of Mrs Clabburn (1860), Norwich Castle Museum and Art Gallery
- Autumn (1860–1862), Norwich Castle Museum and Art Gallery
- Oriana (1861), Tate Britain, London
- King Pelles' Daughter bearing the Sancgraal (1861), private collection
- Mary Magdalene (1862), Norwich Castle Museum and Art Gallery
- La Belle Isolde (1862), private collection
- Mrs. Susanna Rose (1862), Cleveland Museum of Art
- Viven (1863), Manchester Art Gallery
- Morgan le Fay (1864), Birmingham Museum & Art Gallery
- Portrait of Jane Lewis, born 19 January 1793 (1864), private collection
- Gentle Spring (1865), Ashmolean Museum, Oxford
- Perdita (1866), private collection
- Grace Rose (1866), Yale Center for British Art
- Helen of Troy (1867), Walker Art Gallery, Liverpool
- Love's Shadow (1867), private collection
- Medea (1868), Birmingham Museum & Art Gallery
- Miranda (1868), private collection
- Valkyrie (1868–1873)
- The Coral Necklace (1871), Cleveland Museum of Art
- Cassandra, private collection
- Portrait of a woman with red hair, private collection
- Darby, a Yorkshire Terrier, private collection
- Berenice, Queen of Egypt, Leighton House Museum, London
- Portrait of Philip Bedingfeld LL.D, JP (undated), Norwich Castle Museum and Art Gallery

=== Thomas Seddon ===
- In the Desert (1854), private collection
- The Mountains of Moab (1854), Tate Britain, London
- Jerusalem and the Valley of Jehoshaphat from the Hill of Evil Counsel (1854–1855), Tate Britain, London
- View on the Nile (1855), Tate Britain, London
- Pyramids at Gizeh (1855), private collection
- Mount Zion, private collection
- The Citadel of Cairo, private collection

=== Simeon Solomon ===
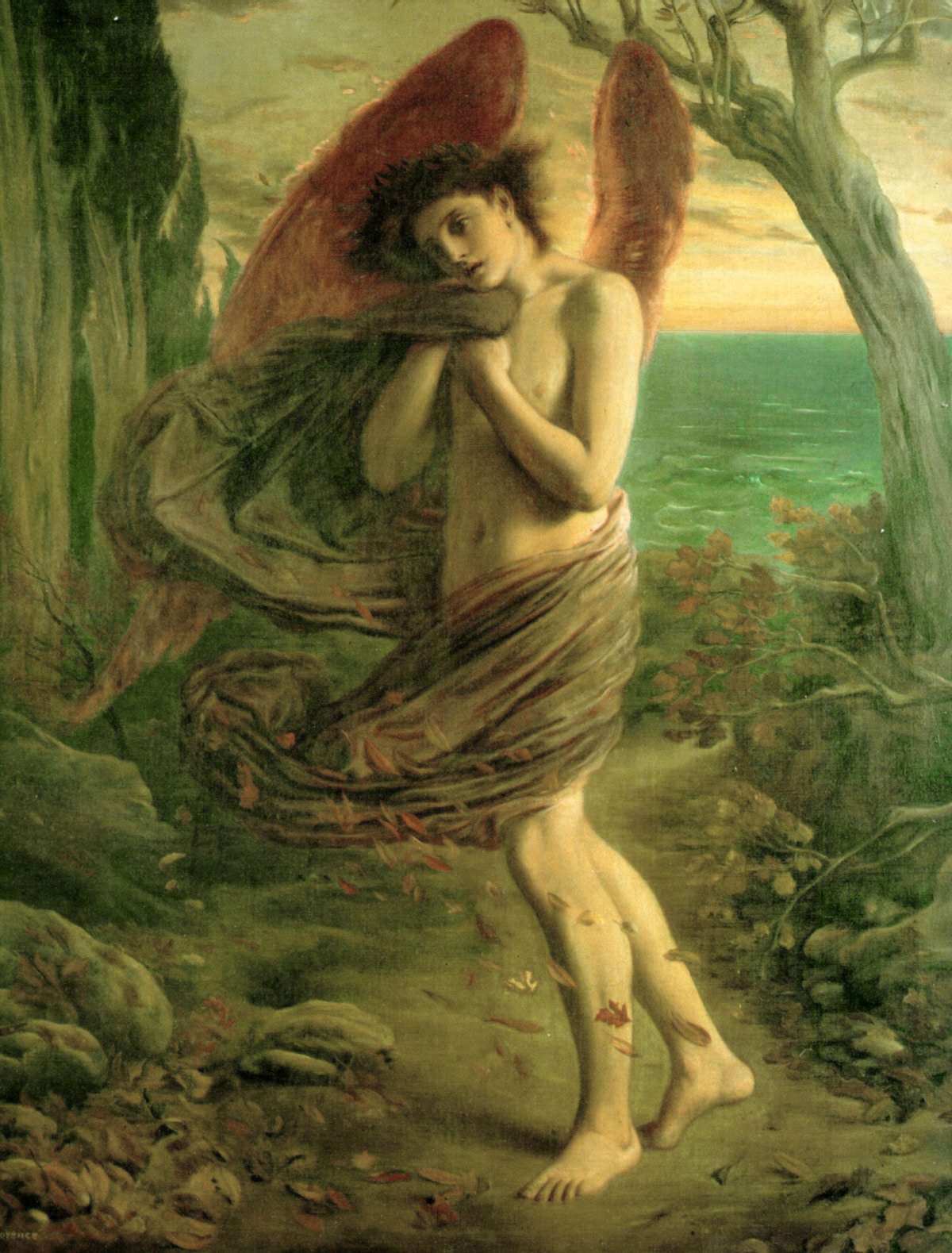
Simeon Solomon – Autumn

- I am starving (1857), National Gallery of Art, Washington D.C., USA
- Self Portrait (1859)
- Love in Autumn (1860)
- Moses (1860)
- The Painter's Pleasaunce (1861)
- Meschach and Abednego preserved from the Burning Fiery Furnace (1863)
- Priestess offering Poppies (1864)
- In the Temple of Venus (1863)
- Damon and Aglae (1866)
- Love in Autumn (1866)
- Bacchus (1867)
- Carrying the Scrolls of the Law (1867)
- Bacchus (1868)
- Pastoral Lovers (1869)
- The Toilet of a Roman Lady (1869), Delaware Art Museum, Wilmington, USA
- The Sleepers, and the One that Watcheth (1870)
- Love Dreaming by the Sea (1871)
- King Solomon (c. 1873), National Gallery of Art, Washington D.C., USA
- The Head of Medusa (1884)
- Erinna of Lesbos (1886)
- The Virgin Knight (1887)
- Night (1890)
- Night and Her Child Asleep (1892)
- Angel Boy (1895)
- The Angel of Death (1895)
- Hypnos, the god of sleep
- The meeting of Dante and Beatrice
- Mercury
- One Watching in the Night
- Potens
- A Prelude by Bach
- Rabbi Carrying the Torah
- Sleep
- Twilight, Pity and Death
- Young Man holding Lord's Prayer
- Youth Reciting Tales to Ladies

=== John Roddam Spencer Stanhope ===
- Penelope (1849)
- Sir Gawaine and the Damsels at the Fountain (1857)
- Thoughts of the Past (1859)
- Robin of Modern Times (1860)
- Juliet and Her Nurse (1863)
- The Wine Press (1864)
- Our Lady of the Water Gate (1870)
- Procris and Cephalus
- Love and the Maiden (1877)
- Night (1878)
- The Waters of Lethe by the Plains of Elysium (1879–1880)
- The Shulamite (c. 1882)
- Charon and Psyche (c. 1883)
- Why Seek Ye the Living Among the Dead? (c. 1886; also known as Resurrection)
- Eve Tempted (1887)
- The Pine Woods of Viareggio (1888)
- Flora (1889)
- Holy Trinity Main Altar Polyptych (1892–1894)
- Holy Trinity Memorial Chapel Polyptych (1892–1894)
- The Escape (c. 1900)

Other works (dates unavailable):

- Andromeda
- Autumn
- Charcoal Thieves
- Cupid and Psyche
- In Memoriam
- Love Betrayed (The Russell Cotes Gallery, Bournemouth)
- The Millpond (watercolour with bodycolour)
- Patience on a Monument Smiling at Grief
- The Vision of Ezekiel: The Valley of Dry Bones
- The Washing Place
- The White Rabbit

=== John William Waterhouse ===
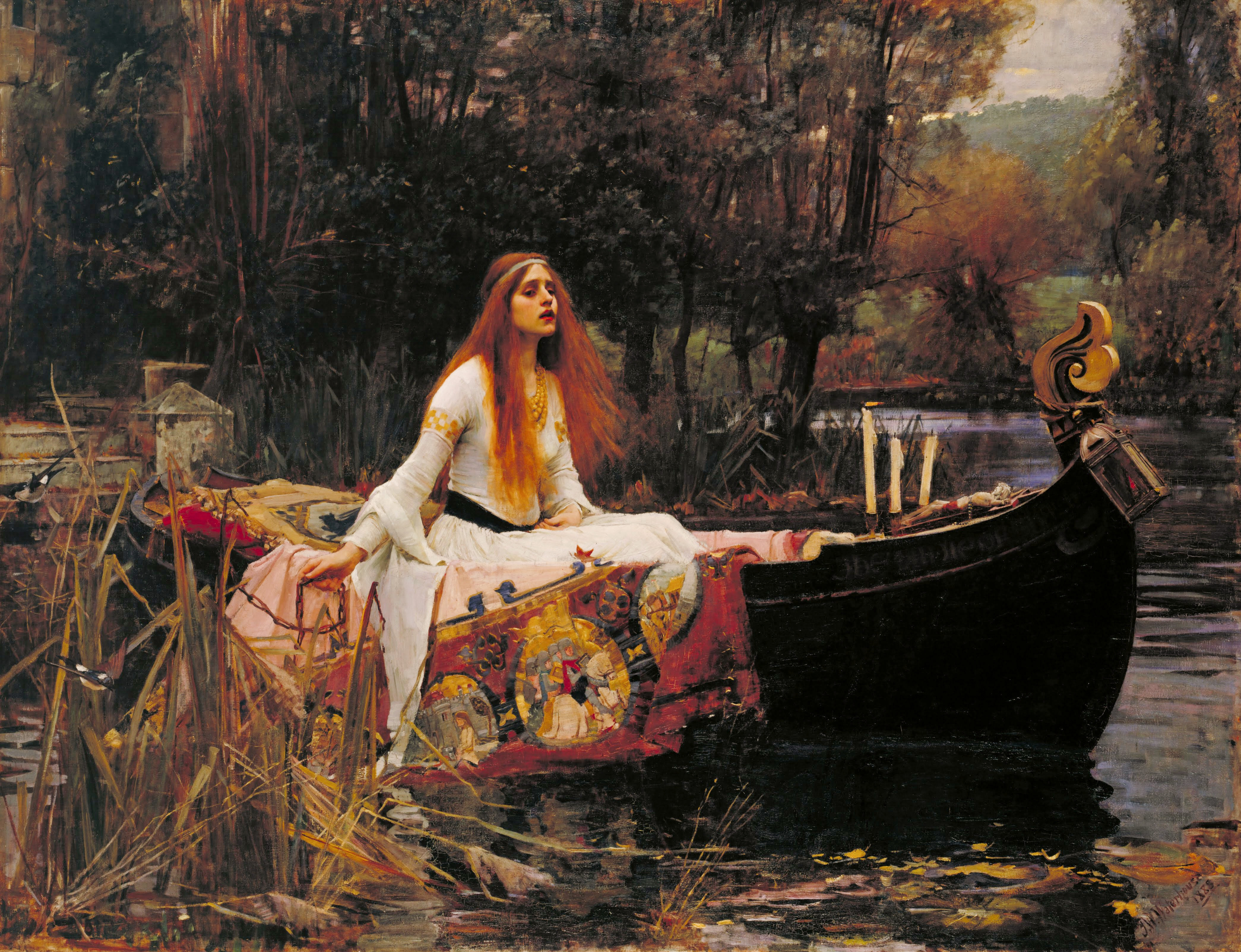
John William Waterhouse – The Lady of Shalott, 1888

- The Unwelcome Companion: A Street Scene in Cairo (1873), Towneley Hall Art Gallery, Burnley
- Sleep and his Half-brother Death (1874), private collection
- The Favourites of the Emperor Honorius (1883), Art Gallery of South Australia, Adelaide
- Consulting the Oracle (1884), Tate, London
- Saint Eulalia (1885), Tate, London
- Esther Kenworthy Waterhouse (c. 1885), Sheffield City Art Galleries, Sheffield
- The Magic Circle (1886), Tate, London
- The Lady of Shalott (1888), Tate, London
- Circe Offering the Cup to Ulysses (1891), Gallery Oldham, Oldham
- Circe Invidiosa (1892), Art Gallery of South Australia, Adelaide
- Hylas and the Nymphs (1896)
- The Siren (c. 1900), private collection
- The Crystal Ball (1902), private collection
- Boreas (1903), private collection
- Echo and Narcissus (1903), Walker Art Gallery, Liverpool
- Danaïdes (1904), private collection
- Jason and Medea (1907), private collection
- Gather Ye Rosebuds While Ye May (1908), private collection
- Gather Ye Rosebuds While Ye May (1909), Odon Wagner Gallery, Toronto
- Circe (The Sorceress) (1911), private collection
- I am Half-Sick of Shadows, said the Lady of Shalott (1916), Art Gallery of Ontario, Toronto
- Dante and Beatrice (c. 1915), Dahesh Museum, New York

=== Daniel Alexander Williamson ===
- Cows Going Home (1859)
- Spring (1859)
- Morecambe Bay from Warton Crag (1862), Walker Art Gallery, Liverpool
- Coniston Old Man from Warton Crag (1863), Walker Art Gallery, Liverpool
- The Coot's Haunt, Broughton in Furness (1863–1864)
- A Grey Day (1865), Walker Art Gallery, Liverpool

=== William Lindsay Windus ===
- The Black Boy (c. 1844), Walker Art Gallery, Liverpool
- Too Late (1858), Tate Britain, London
- Study of a Dead Child, the Artist's Son (1860), Tate Britain, London
- The Flight of Henry VI from Towton (c. 1860–1870), Tate Britain, London
- The Outlaw (1861), Manchester Art Gallery
- The Second Duchess (before 1866), Tate Britain, London
- Mrs Teed, the Artist's Daughter (c. 1880), Tate Britain, London
- Samuel Teed (date unknown), Manchester Art Gallery
- Burd Helen
- The Stray Lamb
