= Waiting (Millais) =

Painting by John Everett Millais

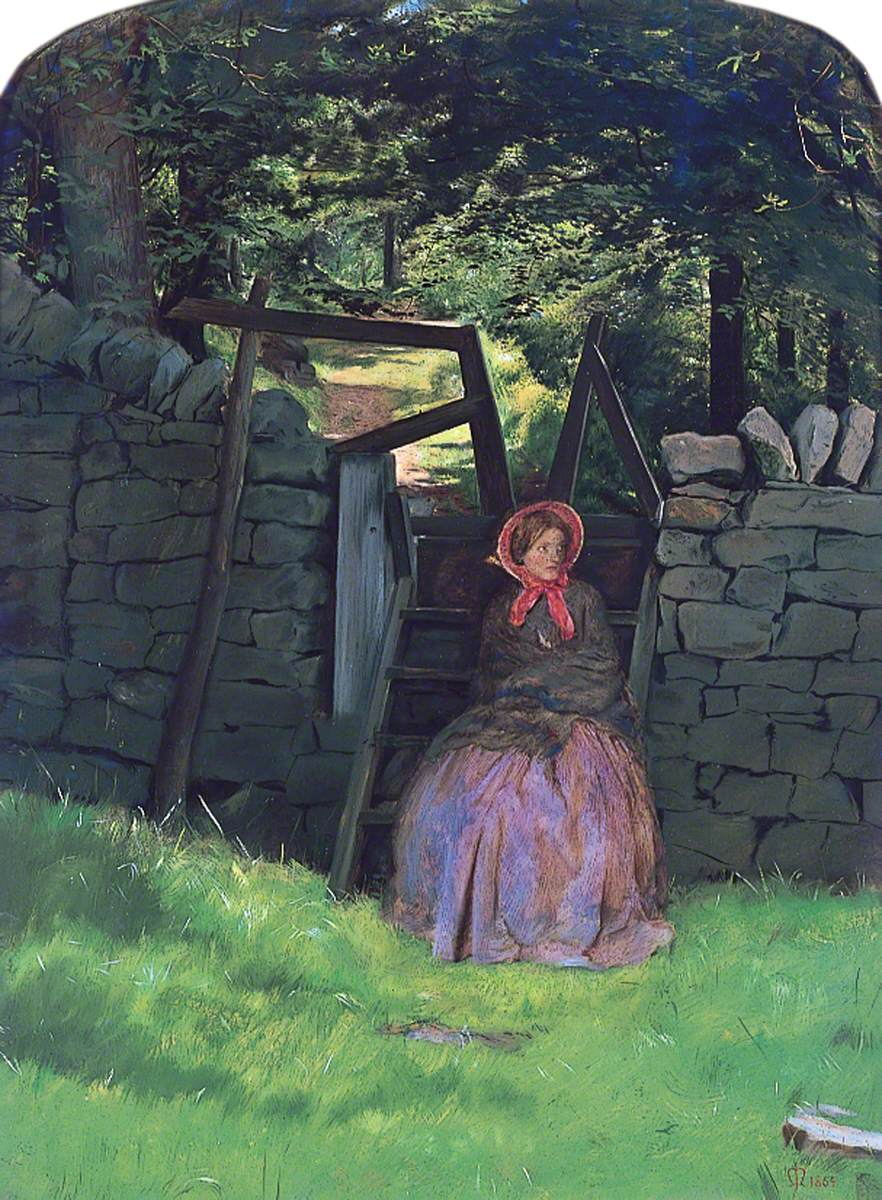
- Artist: John Everett Millais
- Year: 1854
- Type: Oil on mahogany board
- Dimensions: 32.4 cm × 24.8 cm (12.8 in × 9.8 in)
- Location: Birmingham Museums Trust, Birmingham

Waiting or Girl at the Stile or A Girl at a Stile or The Stile is an 1854 oil painting by the English artist John Everett Millais. It shows a woman in a dress, shawl and bonnet sitting on a wooden stile over a dry stone field wall, with woods beyond. She is looking to her left, as if in anticipation.

The painting is one of several small "cabinet paintings" made by Millais in 1854. It has been suggested that the state of the grass and foliage might suggests that it was painted by Millais just before he returned to Scotland in late May 1854 to complete the portrait of John Ruskin he had begun there the previous summer. An 1899 book by art critic Alfred Lys Baldry, Sir John Everett Millais: His Life and Influence, stated that Millais' 1854 portrait The Highland Lassie was a study for Waiting.

The painting was bought in 1854 by Joseph Arden, who already owned Millais' The Order of Release, 1746 (painted 1852–53) and was to go on to buy The Rescue (painted 1855) the following year. In an 1857 article on Arden's collection it is referred to as The Stile; in the 1879 catalogue of the sale of Arden's collection it is referred to as Girl at the Stile. It is first referred to as Waiting in print by Marion Spielmann in 1898, in his Millais and His Works, with Special Reference to the Exhibition at the Royal Academy 1898.

The painting was gifted to Birmingham Museums Trust, Birmingham, by Clara Grace Nettlefold (née Hutton) in 1909.

== See also ==
- List of paintings by John Everett Millais
