= James Collinson =

English painter

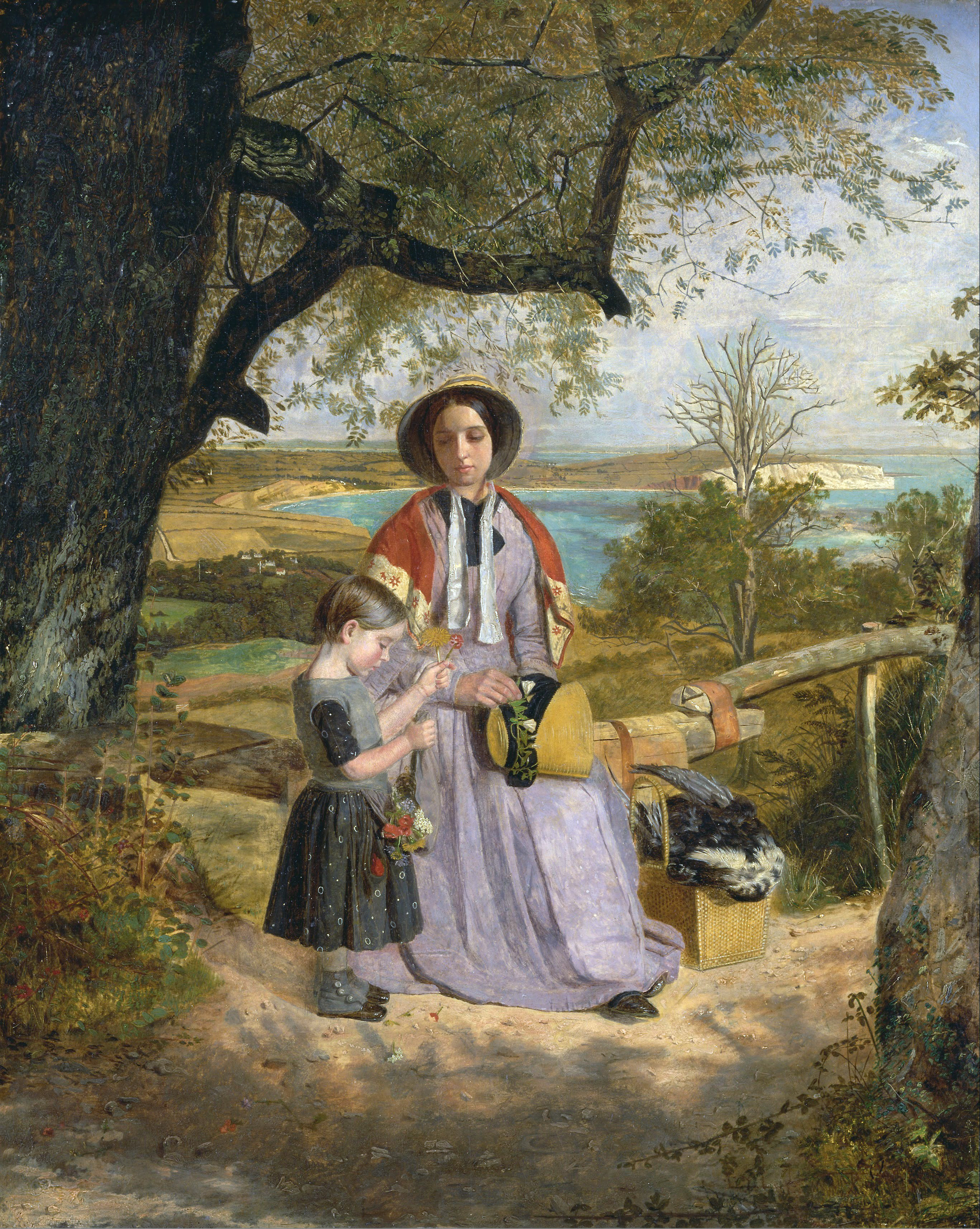
Mother and Child by a Stile, with Culver Cliff, Isle of Wight, in the Distance (1849)

James Collinson (9 May 1825 – 1881) was a Victorian painter who was a member of the Pre-Raphaelite Brotherhood from 1848 to 1850. Collinson was known for the paintings,The Renunciation of St Elizabeth of Hungary, To Let and For Sale. Engaged at one time to the poet Christina Rossetti, their broken engagement also influenced many of her poems.

== Early life ==
Collinson was born at Mansfield, Nottinghamshire, the son of a bookseller. He entered the Royal Academy Schools where was a contemporary of Holman Hunt and Dante Gabriel Rossetti.

== Career ==
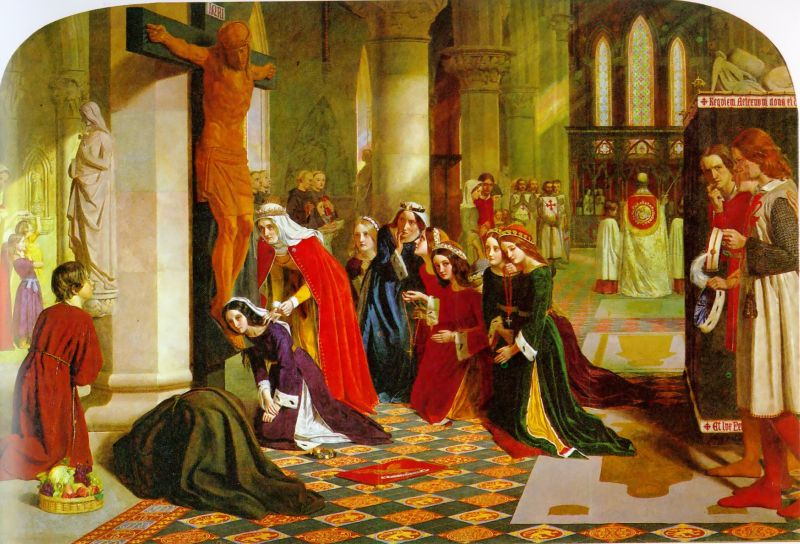
The Renunciation of St Elizabeth of Hungary (1850)

Collinson was a devout Christian who was attracted to the devotional and high church aspects of Pre-Raphaelitism.

During his period as a Pre-Raphaelite, Collinson contributed a long devotional poem to The Germ and produced a number of religious works, most importantly the painting, The Renunciation of St Elizabeth of Hungary (1850).

When Millais's painting Christ in the House of his Parents was accused of blasphemy, Collinson resigned from the Brotherhood in the belief that it was bringing the Christian religion into disrepute. After his resignation, Collinson trained for the priesthood at a Jesuit college, but did not complete his studies.

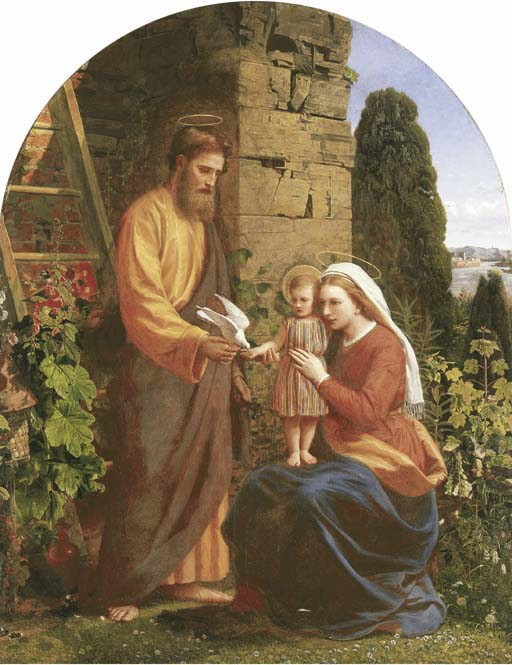
The Holy Family by James Collinson, 1878

Returning to his artistic career, he painted a number of secular genre paintings, the best-known of which are To Let and For Sale, both of which lightheartedly depict pretty women in situations that suggest moral temptation.

Collinson was also secretary of the Society of British Artists from 1861 to 1870.

== Personal life ==
A convert to Catholicism, Collinson reverted to high Anglicanism in order to propose marriage Christina Rossetti, but his conscience forced his return to Catholicism and the ending of the engagement. This had a profound aspect on Rossetti's work, Collinson's departure influencing a great many of her poems.

In 1858, Collinson married Eliza Wheeler, one of the sisters-in-law of the painter John Rogers Herbert, an early influence on the Pre-Raphaelites.

In the latter part of his life, Collinson lived in Brittany, where he painted The Holy Family (1878). Collinson died in April 1881.

== Gallery ==
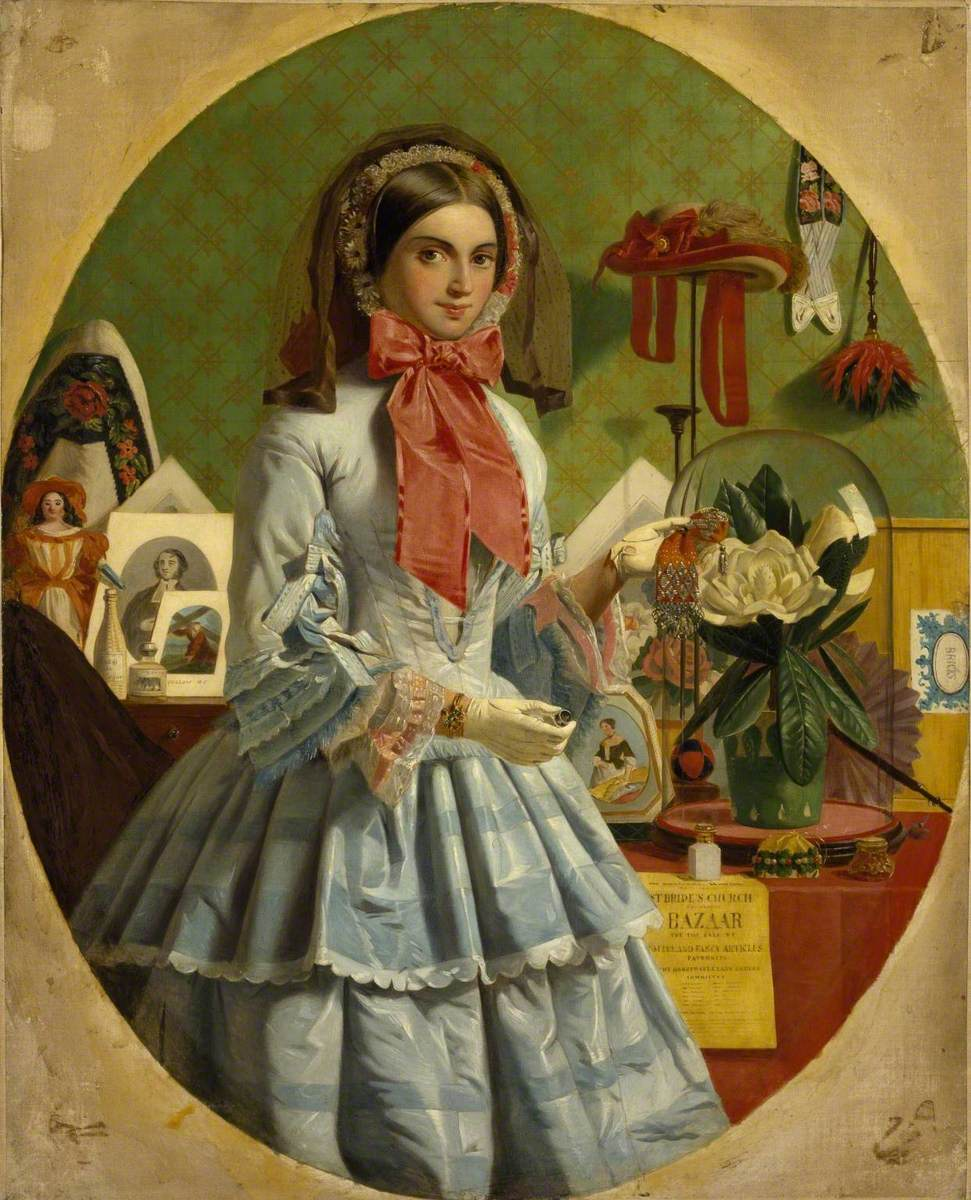
The Empty Purse (1857)

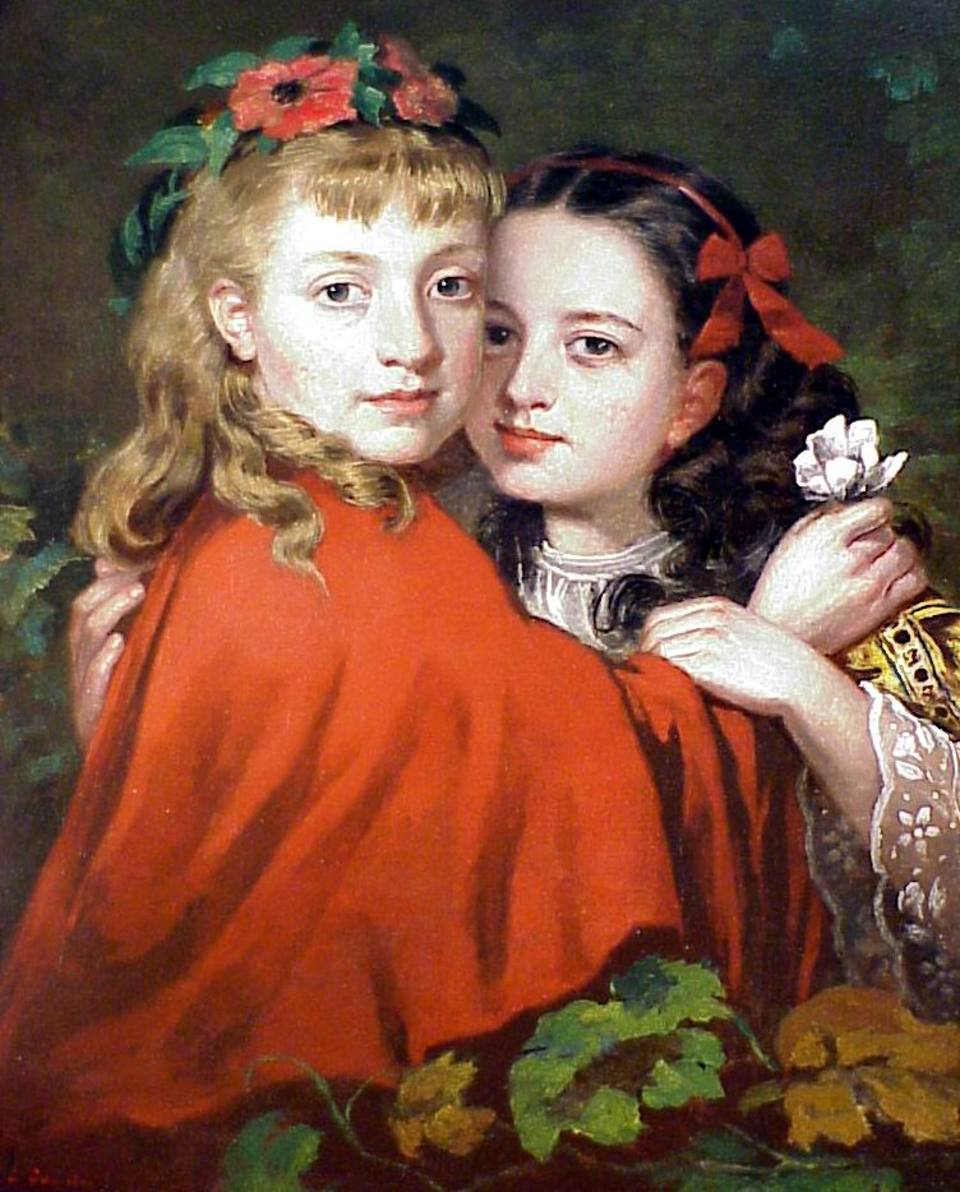
The Sisters (c. 1860)

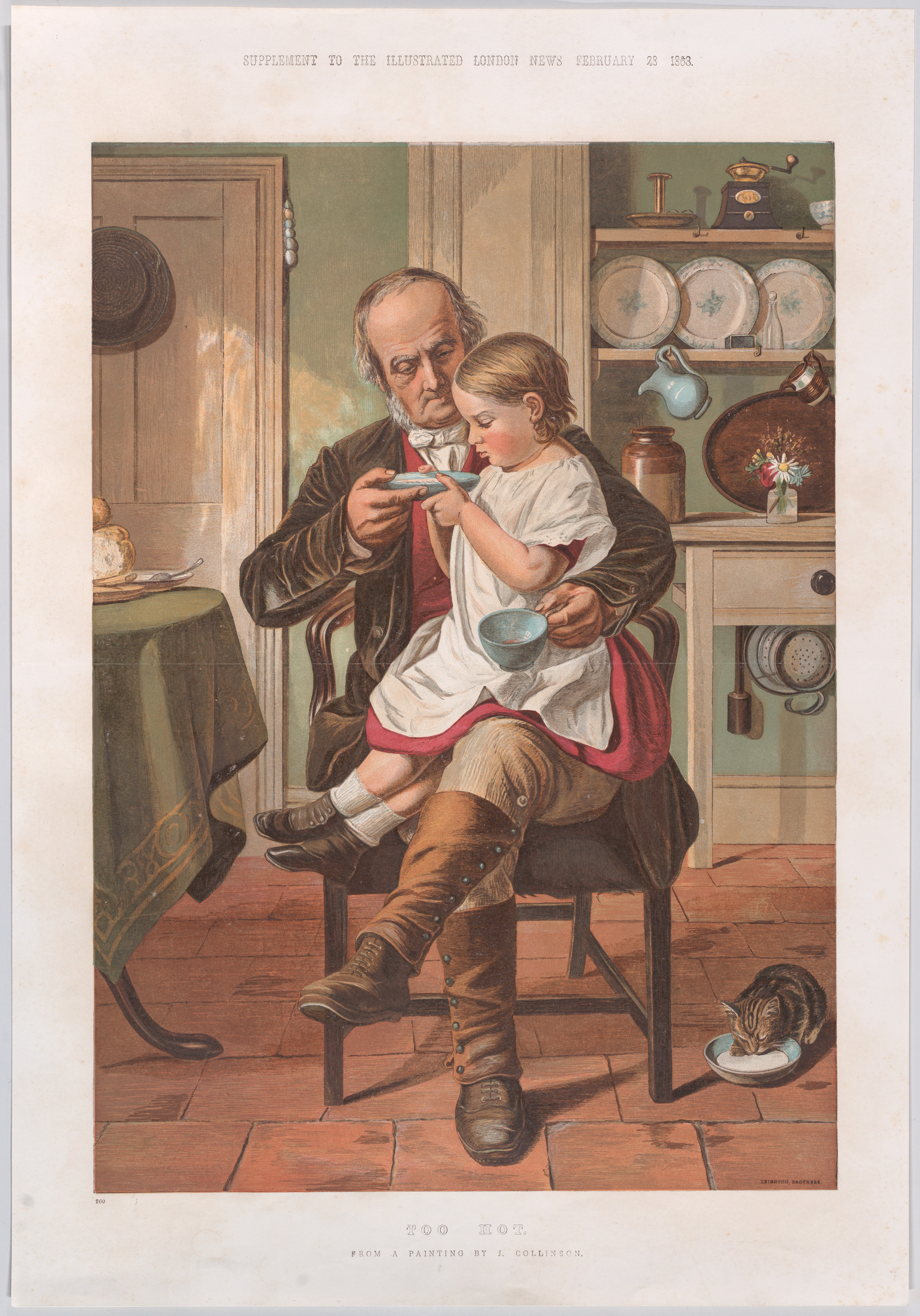
Too Hot, print after Collinson, from Illustrated London News (February 28, 1863)

The Charity Boy's Debut (1847)

== See also ==
- List of Pre-Raphaelite paintings - including the work of James Collinson.
