= The Highland Lassie =

Painting by John Everett Millais

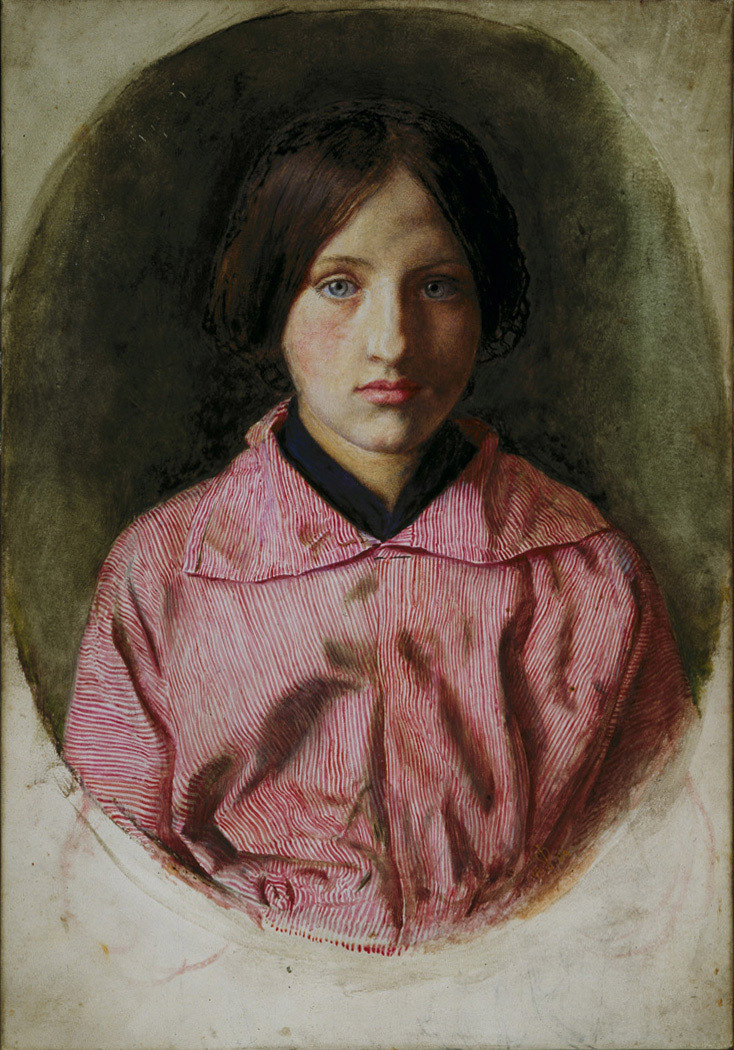
- Artist: John Everett Millais
- Year: 1854
- Type: Oil on board
- Dimensions: 21.6 cm × 17.1 cm (8.5 in × 6.7 in)
- Location: Delaware Art Museum, Wilmington, Delaware

The Highland Lassie or Head of a Scotch Girl is an 1854 oil painting by the English artist John Everett Millais. It is an oval portrait of the head and upper body of a girl or young woman with blue eyes and brown hair, in a red-striped top. She looks directly at the viewer.

The painting was made in Scotland in 1854, during a holiday in the Trossachs, the year after the tumultuous holiday taken there by Millais with the Ruskins, during which Millais and Mrs Ruskin, Effie Gray, had fallen in love. The Ruskins' marriage was annulled in 1854, and Millais and Effie married in 1855.

The identity of the sitter is uncertain. The Delaware Art Museum states she is an anonymous Scottish girl. An 1899 book by art critic Alfred Lys Baldry, Sir John Everett Millais: His Life and Influence, stated that the sitter was Effie Gray: "It was painted from the lady, Miss Euphemia Chalmers Gray". Baldry also stated that the portrait was a study for Waiting, also known as A Girl at a Stile.

The painting was in the ownership of H. Willett Esq. by 1899. It joined the collection of Delaware Art Museum, Wilmington, Delaware in 1935, as part of the Samuel and Mary R. Bancroft Memorial.

== See also ==
- List of paintings by John Everett Millais
