= Mrs Campbell McInnes (painting) =

Painting by John Collier

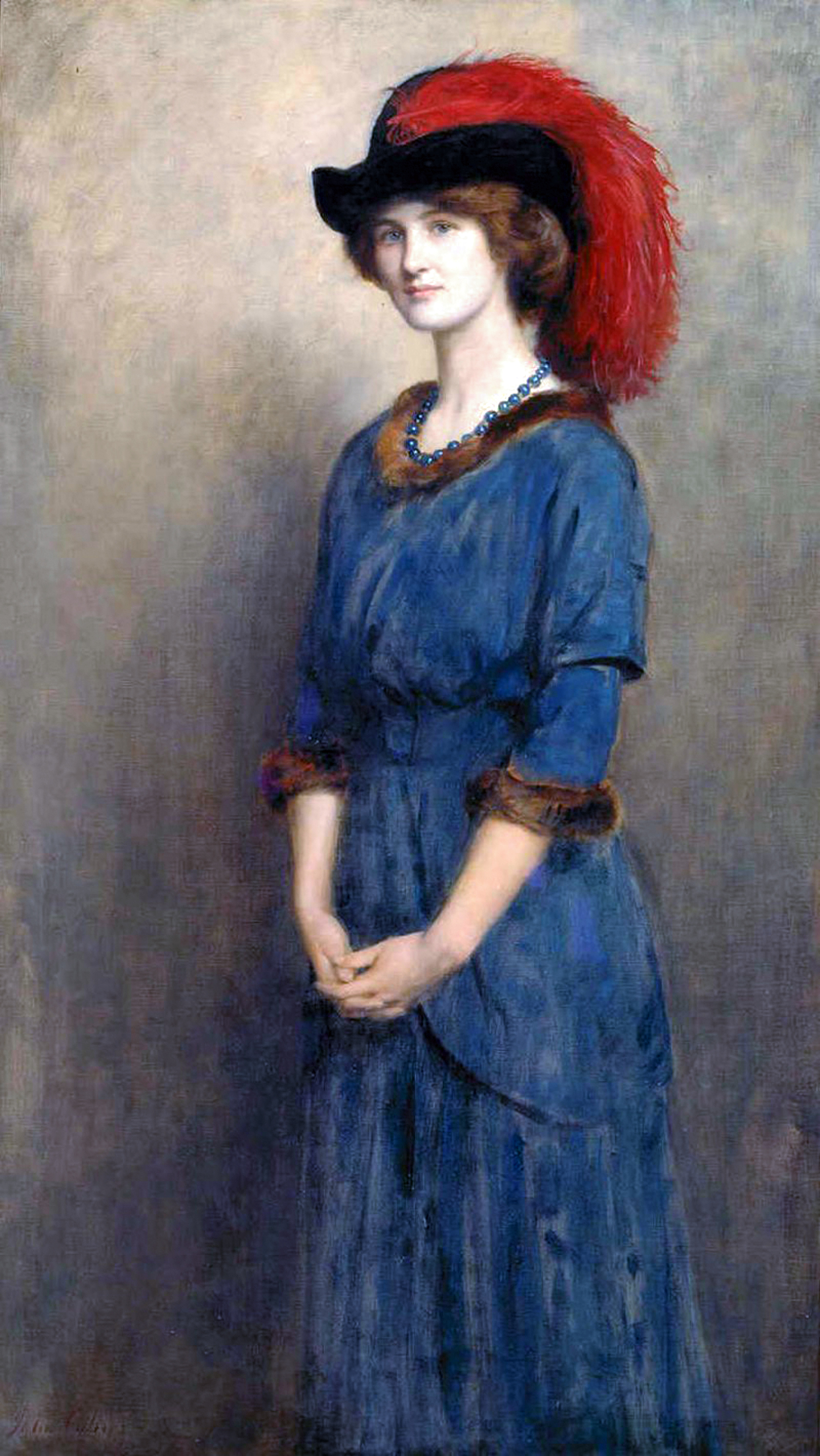
- Artist: John Collier
- Year: 1912
- Medium: Oil on canvas
- Dimensions: 158.4 cm × 91.7 cm (62.4 in × 36.1 in)
- Location: National Gallery of Victoria, Melbourne

Mrs Campbell McInnes is an oil-on-canvas painting by English artist John Collier, created in 1912. It was made in London, England, and is signed by the artist. It is held at the National Gallery of Victoria, in Melbourne, which acquired it in 1960.

== Description ==
English writer Angela Campbell, who was a maternal granddaughter of the Pre-Raphaelite painter Edward Burne-Jones, married the English professional singer James Campbell McInnes in 1911, thus becoming Angela Campbell McInnes, until their divorce in 1917. After her marriage to the Australian engineer George Thirkel, in 1918, she became known as Angela Thirkell, and she would be a renowned novelist under that name.

In this portrait, made shortly after her first marriage, she appears standing in front of an empty background, with her hands crossed and looking calmly directly to the viewer, while also wearing a fine blue dress, a blue collar and a fashionable dark hat with a red plume.
