= The Sisters (Collinson) =

Painting by James Collinson

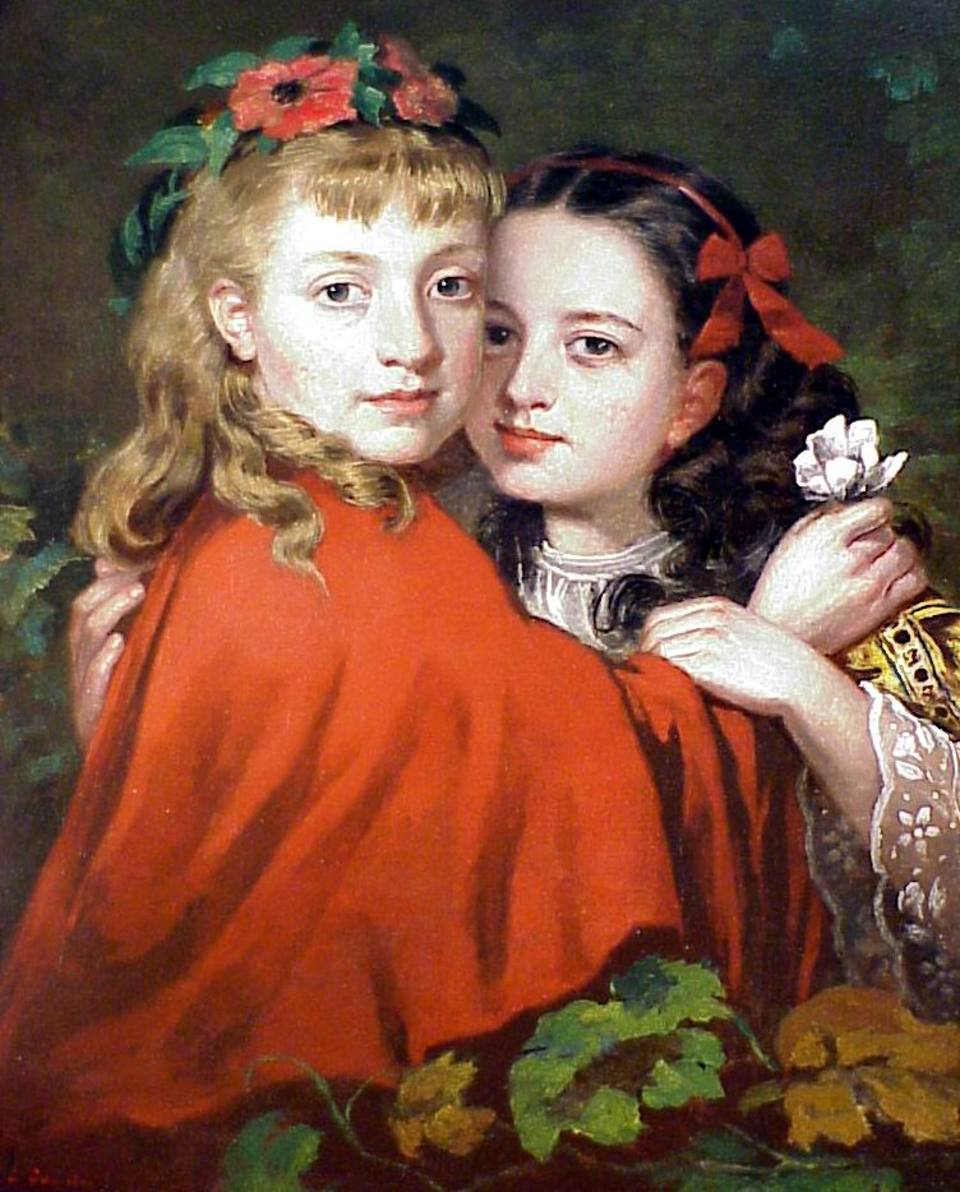
- Artist: James Collinson
- Medium: Oil on canvas
- Dimensions: 322 cm × 400 cm (127 in × 160 in)

The Sisters is a c. 1860 oil painting illustrated by Victorian painter James Collinson, who was a Pre-Raphaelite Brotherhood member (1848 to 1850) from the mid-19th century.
