= The Order of Release, 1746 =

Painting by John Everet Millais

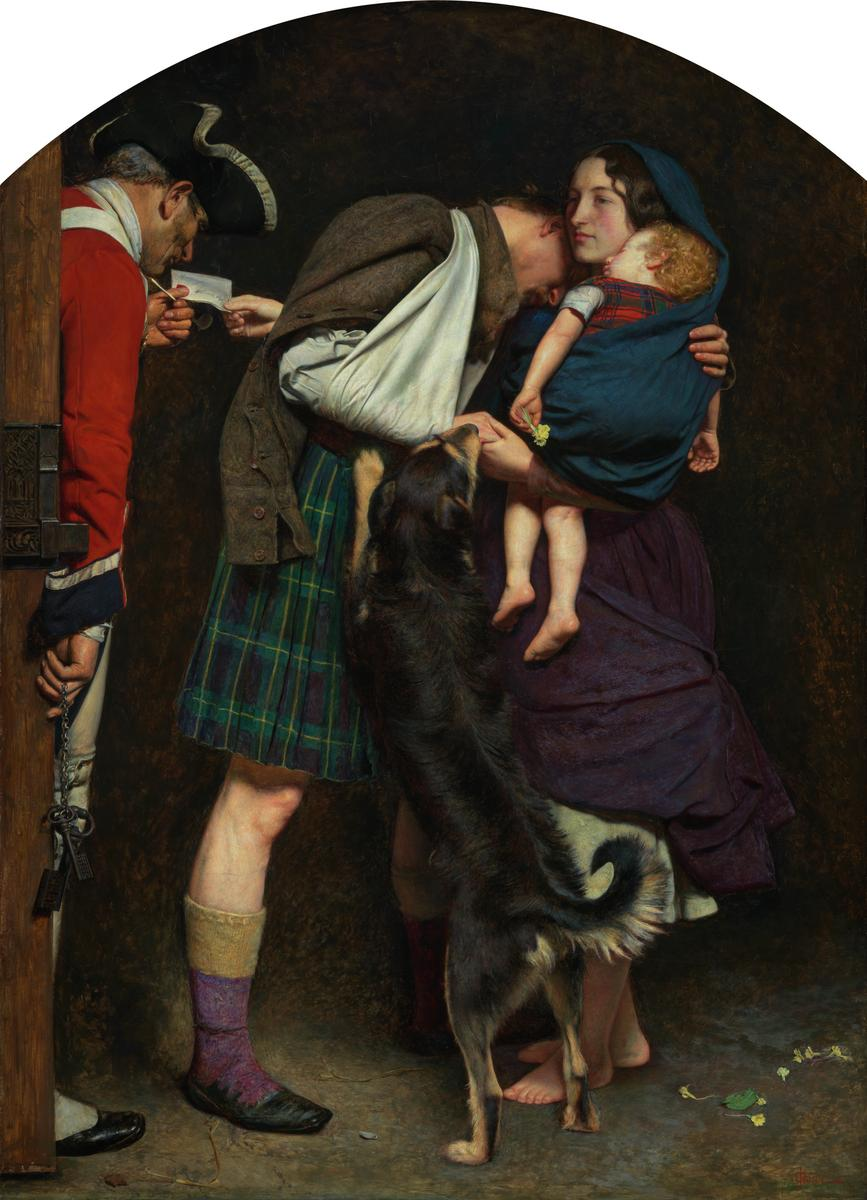
- Artist: John Everett Millais
- Year: 1852–1853
- Medium: Oil on canvas
- Dimensions: 102.9 cm × 73.7 cm (40.5 in × 29.0 in)
- Location: Tate Britain, London

The Order of Release, 1746 is an 1852–53 painting by John Everett Millais exhibited in 1853. It is notable for marking the beginnings of Millais's move away from the highly medievalist Pre-Raphaelitism of his early years. Effie Gray, who later left her husband John Ruskin for Millais, modelled for the female figure.

== The painting ==
The painting depicts the wife of a Highland Jacobite soldier, who has been imprisoned after the Jacobite rising of 1745, with an order securing his release. She holds her child, showing the order to a guard, while her husband embraces her.

The Illustrated London News reviewed the painting as follows:

It is time now that we speak of Millais – Millais the Pre-Raffaelite [sic]; the "pretender" Millais that was; the "usurper" Millais that is; the "legitimate" Millais that perhaps (much virtue in that little word) may be; and who has certainly a larger crowd of admirers in his little corner in the Middle Room than all the Academicians put together command; …
Truth to say, Mr. Millais, in this "Order of Release" (265), has achieved for himself an "order of merit" worth more than any academic honour, and has earned a fame which a whole corporate academy might be proud to portion amongst its constituent members. Whilst we admit – nay assert this – we would by no means wish to be understood as enrolling ourselves incontinently of this young artist's "party" (for there is partisanship in everything, even in art); but simply as asserting that Pre-Raffaelitism (or rather the artists who have been foolishly styled Pre-Raffaelites) is a "great fact", and perhaps may lead to the regeneration of art in this country; …
The subject is simply that of a wife, with child in her arms, coming with an order of release for her husband, who has been taken in the Civil Wars. The husband, overcome with emotions, and weak from a recent wound (his arm is in a sling), can but fall upon her neck and weep; moan, "firm of purpose", sheds no tear; she has none to shed; but her eye is red and heavy with weeping and waking; and she looks at the stern and unconcerned gaoler with a proud look, expressing that she has won the reward for all her trouble past. The colouring, the textural execution, are marvellous (for these degenerate days).

The dark, generalised background is a departure from the highly detailed backgrounds of earlier works such as Ophelia, as is the emphatic chiaroscuro. However, the portrayal of tense relationships disrupted by historical dramas was a continuation of the theme of A Huguenot and The Proscribed Royalist, 1651.

While working on the painting, Millais began to develop a friendship with Effie, the wife of his principal supporter, the critic John Ruskin. A study for the painting has a drawing of her head on one side and an image of a man kneeling in supplication to a woman on the other, labelled "accepted."

== Ownership ==
The painting was bought in 1853 by Joseph Arden, a lawyer, for £400. Arden went on to collect further paintings by Millais: Waiting (painted 1854) and The Rescue (painted 1855). The latter is a pendant (companion piece) to The Order of Release.

The picture featured at both the Royal Academy Exhibition of 1853 at the National Gallery and at the Salon of 1855 in Paris, part of the Exposition Universelle. It was presented to the Tate Gallery in 1898 by Sir Henry Tate.

== In popular culture ==
The title of the painting was adopted for the 1947 book The Order of Release by William Milbourne James about the love triangle, and also of a radio play about it broadcast in 1998. The painting of the picture is dramatised onstage in the play Mrs Ruskin (2003) by Kim Morrissey, and in the TV series Desperate Romantics (2009).

== See also ==
- List of paintings by John Everett Millais
