= Queen Eleanor (painting) =

1858 painting by Frederick Sandys

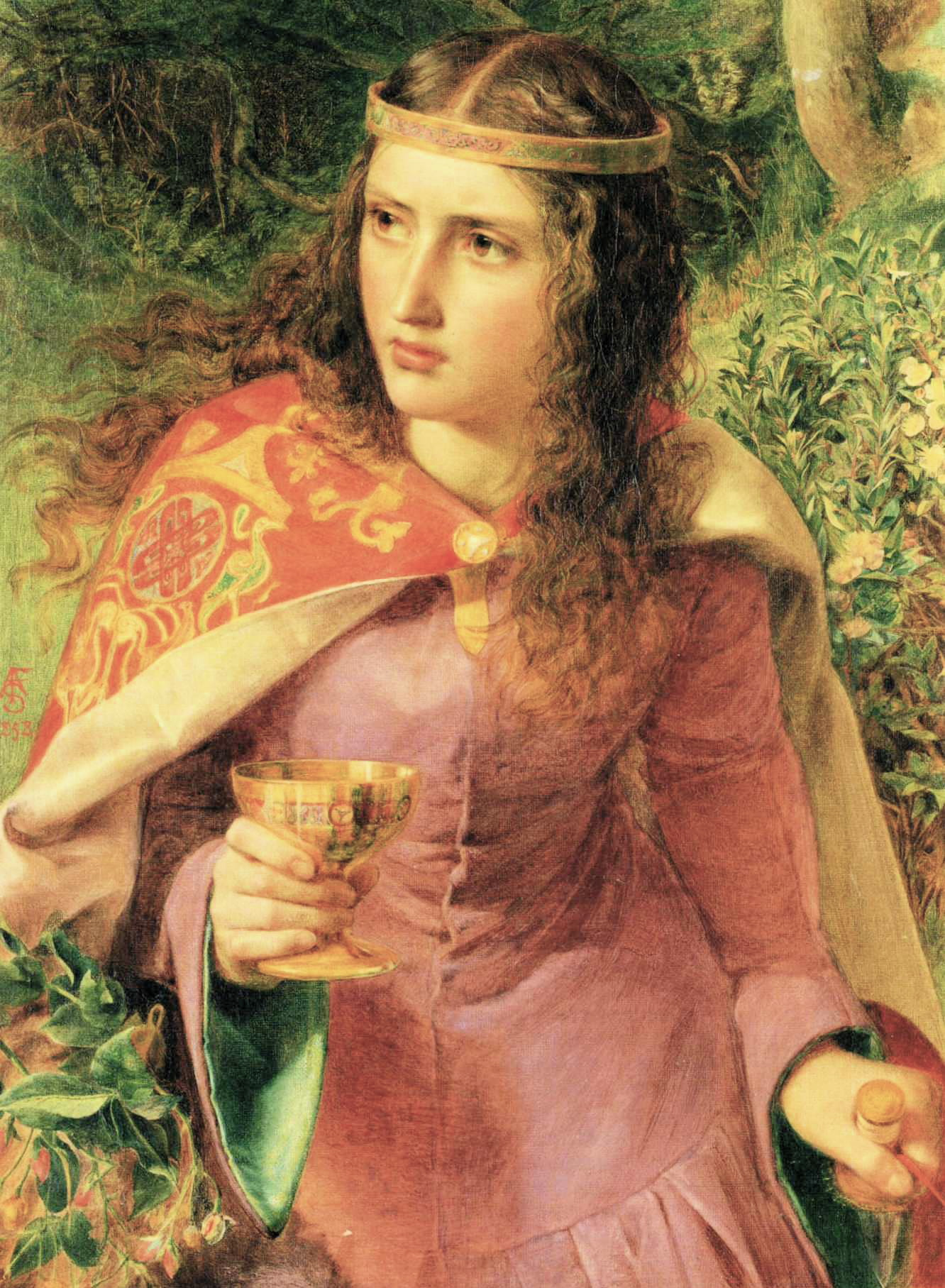
- Artist: Frederick Sandys
- Year: 1858
- Medium: Oil on canvas
- Dimensions: 40.6 cm × 30.5 cm (16.0 in × 12.0 in)
- Location: National Museum Cardiff, Cardiff
- Owner: National Museum Cardiff
- Accession: NMW A 185
- Website: Museum of Wales

Queen Eleanor is an 1858 oil-on-canvas painting by Pre-Raphaelite artist Frederick Sandys which depicts Queen Eleanor of Aquitaine, the wife of King Henry II of England, on her way to poison her husband's mistress, Rosamund Clifford. The painting is displayed at the National Museum Cardiff, which obtained it in 1981.

== Legend ==
The traditional story recounts that King Henry concealed his affair from Queen Eleanor by conducting it within the innermost recesses of a complicated maze. Queen Eleanor penetrated the labyrinth while trailing a red cord, shown in the subject's left hand, and forced her rival to choose between a dagger and the bowl of poison. Rosamund chose the poison, and died.
