= The Rescue (painting) =

Painting by John Everet Millais

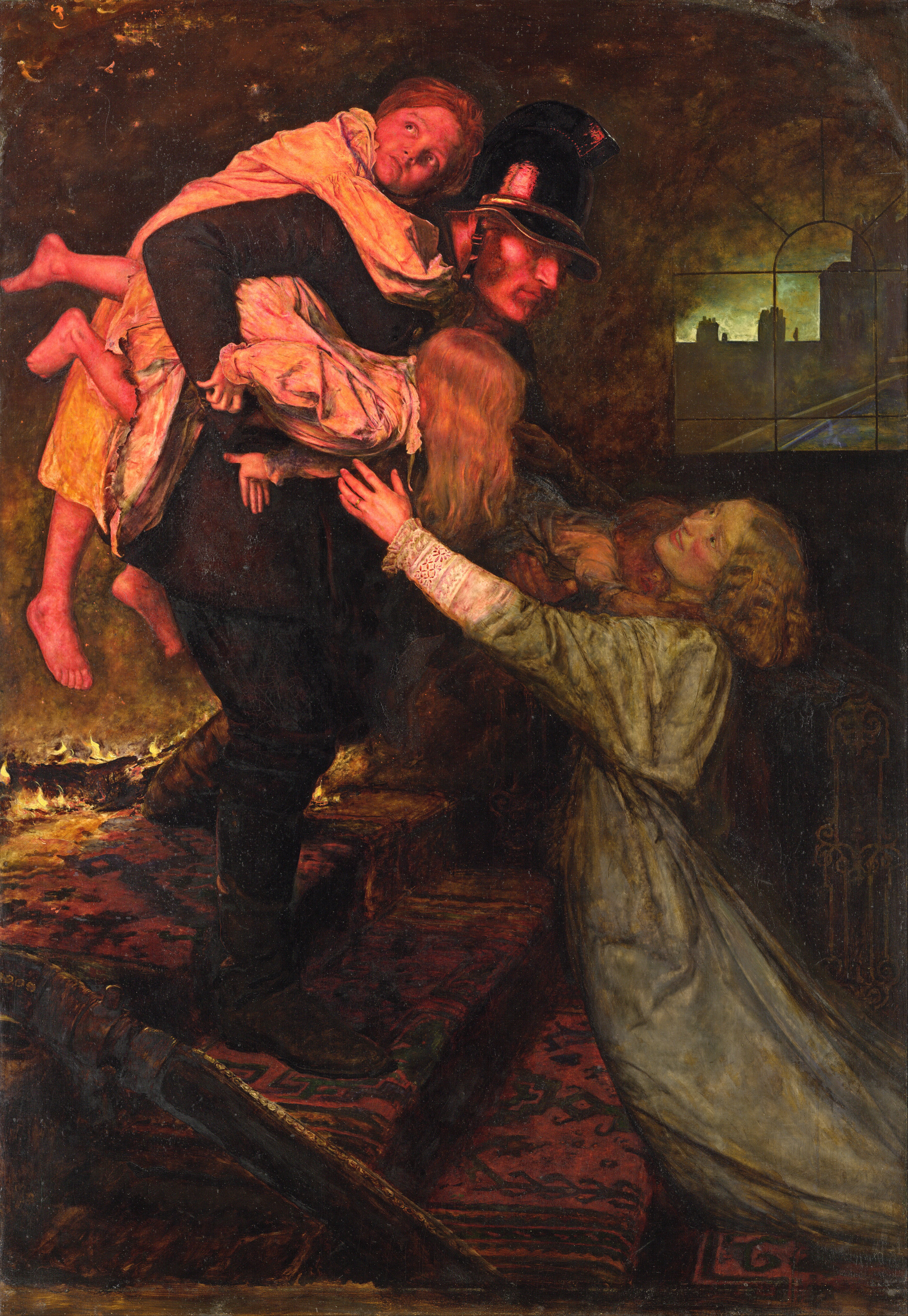
- Artist: John Everett Millais
- Year: 1855
- Medium: Oil on canvas
- Dimensions: 121.5 cm × 83.6 cm (47.8 in × 32.9 in)
- Location: National Gallery of Victoria, Melbourne

The Rescue is an oil on canvas painting by John Everett Millais, from 1855. It is depiction of a fireman rescuing three children from a house fire, with their mother receiving them back into her arms.

== The painting ==
Millais witnessed the death of a fireman in the course of a rescue, and decided to depict the subject. The fire brigade had only recently been transformed from private businesses dedicated to the protection of property to a public institution charged to protect life first.

Millais sought to create the correct effects of light and smoke by using a sheet of coloured glass and by burning planks of wood. This emphasis on fleeting effects of colour and light was a new departure in his art.

The painting is also notable for its startling transitions of colour, particularly the dramatic effect by which the sleeve of the mother's nightgown changes from slatey blue to pale pink. This led to much critical comment at the time.

The Rescue is a pendant (companion piece) to Millais' The Order of Release, 1746 (1852–53).

== Exhibition and reception ==
Millais regarded The Rescue as one of his greatest paintings, and chose it as his submission for the Royal Academy's 1855 exhibition. It was well-received by critics, who recognised the subject matter as startlingly modern for Millais. John Ruskin considered it "the only great picture exhibited this year; but this is very great. The immortal element is in it to the full."

Robyn Cooper argues that some criticism of the painting arose from the fact that it depicted a virile working class man rescuing middle class children, while their father is nowhere to be seen. The mother's opened arms seem to greet this strong new man as much as her children.

== See also ==
- List of paintings by John Everett Millais
