= Cadmus and Harmonia =

Cadmus and Harmonia may refer to:

- Cadmus and Harmonia, the founder and first king of Thebes and the Gaeco-Roman goddess of harmony.
- Cadmus and Harmonia (painting), a 1877 painting by Evelyn De Morgan
- Cadmus and Harmonia, a pseudonym used by John Buchan, Baron Tweedsmuir and Susan Buchan, Baroness Tweedsmuir.
