= Flora (De Morgan) =

Painting by Evelyn De Morgan

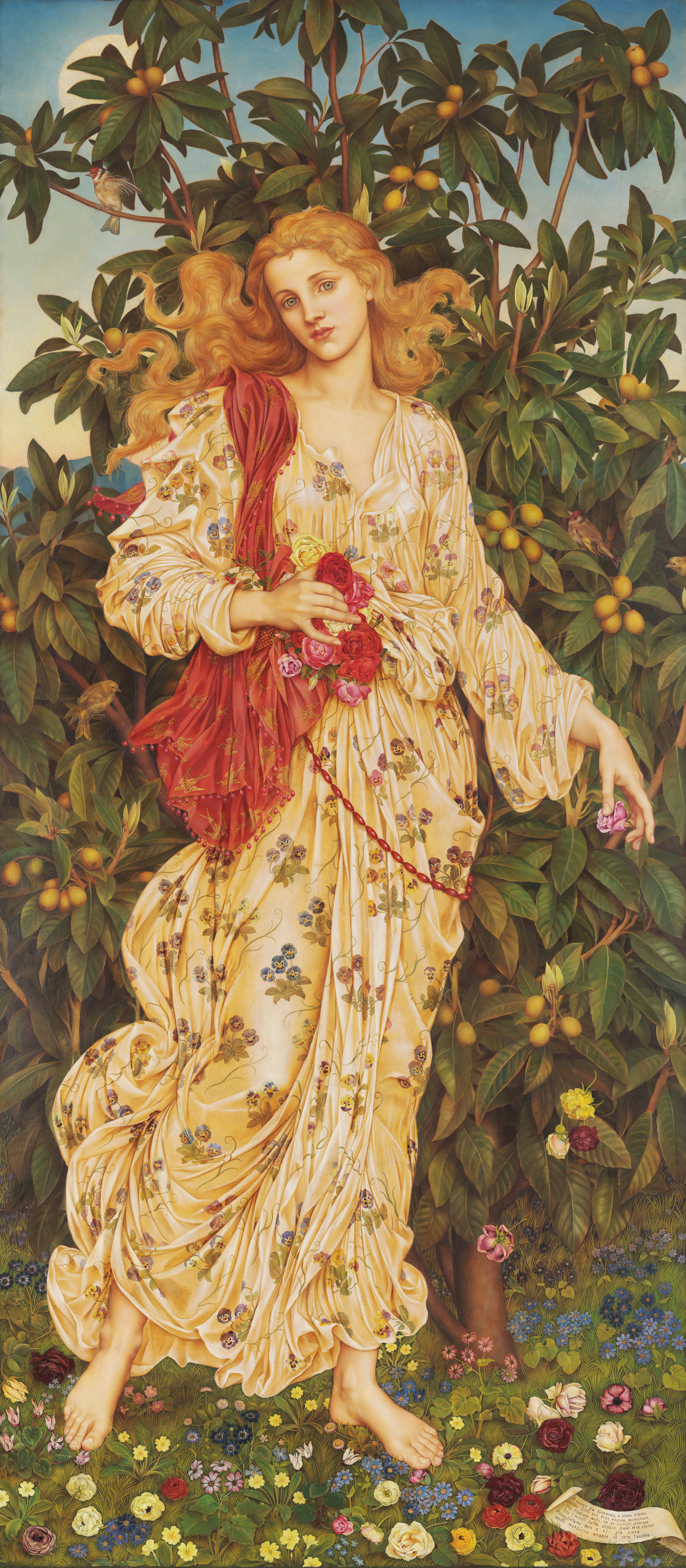
- Artist: Evelyn De Morgan
- Year: 1894
- Medium: Oil on canvas
- Dimensions: 199 cm × 88 cm (78 in × 35 in)
- Location: Wightwick Manor, Wolverhampton

Flora is an oil painting by the English artist Evelyn De Morgan, from 1894.

Her paintings are figural, foregrounding the female body through the use of spiritual, mythological, and allegorical themes. Flora is the Roman goddess of the flowers. In this portrait Flora is depicted in front of a nespola or loquat tree which bears fruits in the spring. The painting is inspired by Botticelli's work, Primavera and The Birth of Venus.

The painting, owned by De Morgan Foundation was displayed at De Morgan Centre until its closure in 2014, since then it is exhibited at Wightwick Manor, run by National Trust for Places of Historic Interest or Natural Beauty.
