= The Love Potion =

Painting by Evelyn De Morgan

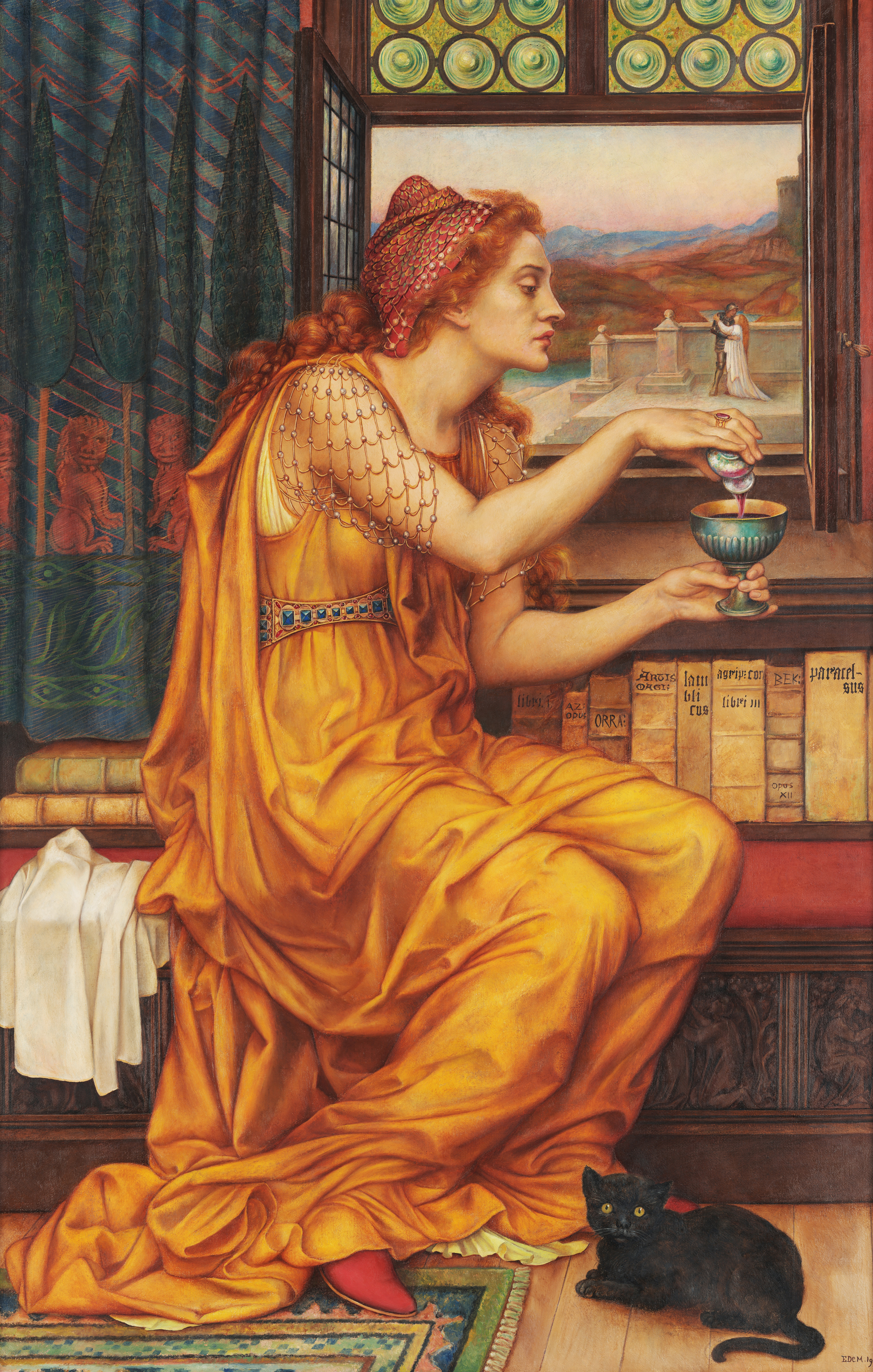
- Artist: Evelyn De Morgan
- Year: 1903
- Medium: Oil on canvas
- Dimensions: 104.1 cm × 52.1 cm (41.0 in × 20.5 in)
- Location: De Morgan Centre; London

The Love Potion is an oil on canvas painting by the English artist Evelyn De Morgan, from 1903. It depicts a witch with a black cat familiar at her feet. According to Elise Lawton Smith, the painting "exhibits a Pre-Raphaelite fascination with medieval subjects and decorative detailing." The model was Jane Morris.

== Analysis ==
The Love Potion pushed the boundaries of society's expectations of women by "exploring the nature of female authority through the practice of sorcery". The painting differs from most of De Morgan's earlier works by featuring a sorceress as the subject, rather than a Christian or mythological figure. The sorceress is dressed in an ornate gold gown, which is symbolic of her mastery of skill and the final stage of the alchemical system of progression toward salvation. Her mastery is further evidenced by leather bound books on the shelf, which were popular alchemy texts during the late nineteenth century. The subject sits in profile, which creates a sense of intensity and authority. Her intent stare is fixated on the potion she is mixing in her chalice, which mirrors the gold and sapphire blue of her gown.

This repetition of color reinforced the idea that whatever potion she is creating may be for personal gain. A couple is seen embracing in the background directly above the chalice, which suggests that the potion may also have to do with them. This idea is further supported by a piece of white cloth draped on the bench behind the sorceress, which looks like it's the missing piece from the woman's dress.

In the foreground of the work is a black cat with perfectly round, glowing green eyes. The cat's eyes mirror the green circular glass detail above the sorceress, which gives the illusion of many eyes watching her at work. The cat resembles the cat seen in the foreground of Édouard Manet's 1865 painting Olympia, in which the animal is a symbol of prostitution. Although the sorceress in The Love Potion is not a prostitute, the purpose of the cat may still work to symbolize similar taboo practices such as alchemy, which was also frowned upon in Edwardian society. The colours of the setting sun in the background create a mysterious setting, further suggesting something illicit is taking place.

The Love Potion is an example of De Morgan's characteristic use of bold colors and strong female imagery. Although the subject matter differs slightly from the majority of her works, it displays her style and impeccable attention to detail. Moreover, this work illustrates de Morgans connection to spiritualism. De Morgan used Spiritualist texts and theories as a guideline in several of her paintings. In this artwork, de Morgan applies colour theory to enhance the female figure’s importance and dominance. According to Smith, this painting is stylistically equivalent to other Pre-Raphaelite works that were created during this time. However, her spiritual iconography offers the viewer an interesting perspective: "She uses her spiritualist vocabulary to subvert and renegotiates traditional roles and stereotypes of women, providing instead a strong, powerful, skilled, intelligent protagonist, capable of reaching the enlightenment she herself sought."

In this painting, the viewer is presented with a female figure who brews a love potion. Instead of depicting the figure as a conventional sorceress, as was traditional in the nineteenth century, de Morgan portrays the woman as a scholar. She is painted as an intellectual and ambitious woman. According to the De Morgan Foundation, several aspects are shaped by spiritualism. Thus the work should be interpreted as an allegorical painting on the progress of the soul towards enlightenment. Firstly, de Morgan depicted some books in the background that included titles of popular texts within the spiritualist movement. Secondly, the colour scheme that she used in this painting is based on alchemical colour symbolism. This theory was promoted by the Renaissance botanist, physician, astrologer, general occultist, and alchemist Paracelsus. According to this theory, four colours mark the progressive stages towards enlightenment. It is said that these stages will eventually lead to a complete state of enlightenment which is represented by the colour gold. The four colours that mark this progress are black, white, red, and yellow. The alchemical theory steps are similar to the phases one needs to take to reach a spiritual illumination state. According to Smith this spiritual theory, this process involved several steps: "from calcination ('the death of the profane'), solution ('the purification of matter'), sublimation ('the suffering resulting from the mystic detachment from the world and the dedication to spiritual striving'), to philosophic congelation, a harmonious union of opposites, especially between the male or stable principle and the female or variable principle". Thus, this painting illustrates Evelyn's use of spiritualist texts and theories in her pre-war art.
