= Helen of Troy (painting) =

1898 painting by Evelyn De Morgan

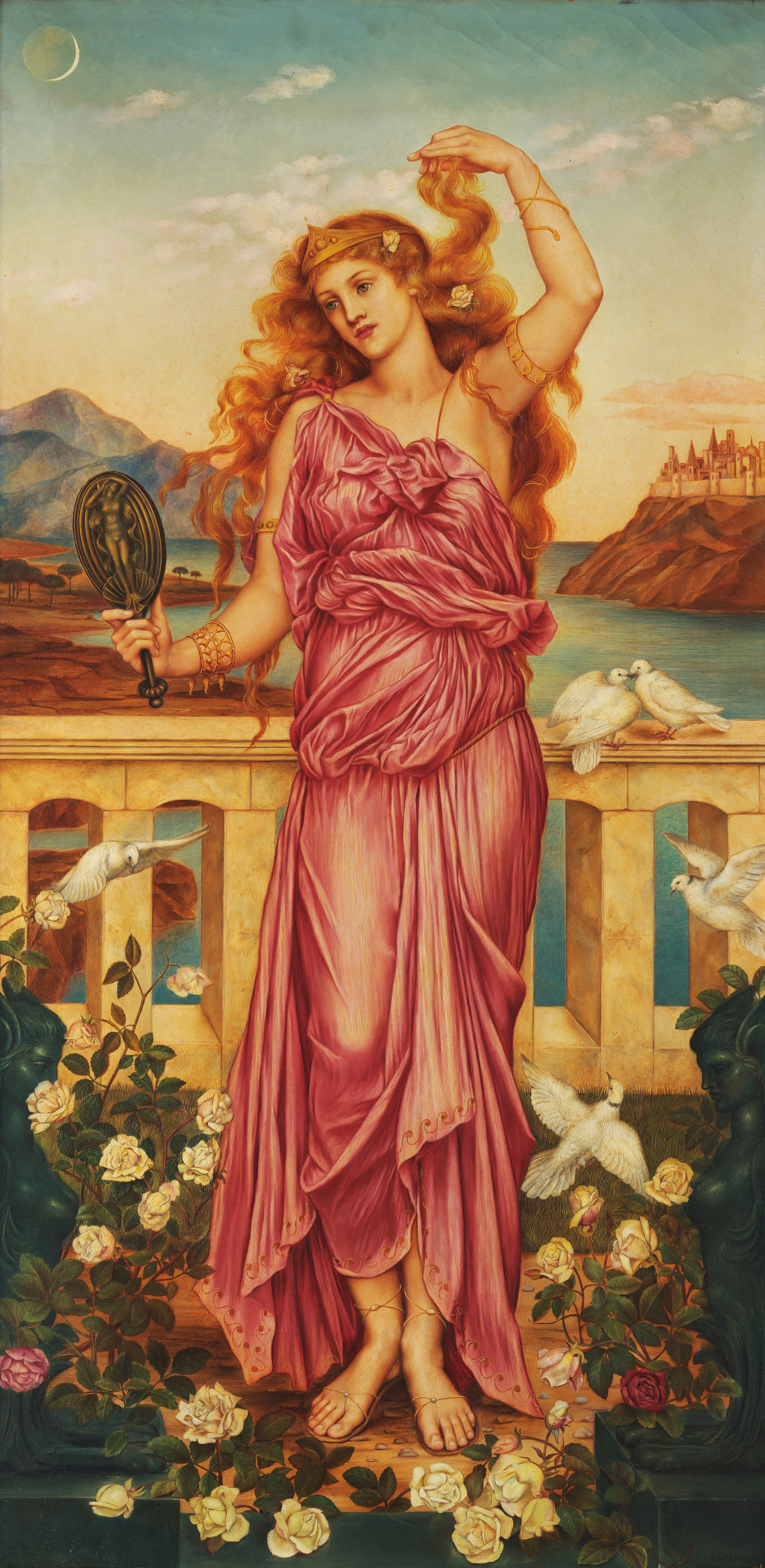
- Artist: Evelyn De Morgan
- Year: 1898
- Medium: Oil on canvas
- Dimensions: 124 cm × 73.8 cm (49 in × 29.1 in)
- Location: Wightwick Manor; Wolverhampton

Helen of Troy is an oil on canvas painting by the English artist Evelyn De Morgan, from 1898. It is a depiction of Helen of Troy commissioned by William Imrie of Liverpool. It is held at Wightwick Manor, in Wolverhampton.

== Description ==
Compositionally, the painting is similar to De Morgan's Flora and Cassandra: Helen is standing upright and tall, in a peaceful posture that reminds to Boticcelli's representations of Greek and Roman goddesses (such as Athena or Venus) that are, at the same time, an evocation of classical art, a usual characteristic between Renaissance artists. Helen has been removed from the common artistic elements of the Trojan War: despite dealing with a typically bellic topic, De Morgan decides to paint, instead of weapons and battles, the wonderful pink clothes and the fascinated look that Helena put on the mirror that is reflecting her beautiful face, elements that can be read as symbols of her inconscient vanity, which eventually brought a long and terrible war and destruction to the city of Troy, which we can see in the last term of the composition, on top of a hill. The presence of the moon-sun in the sky is also related to her feminine and voluble nature.
