= The Gilded Cage (De Morgan) =

Painting by Evelyn De Morgan

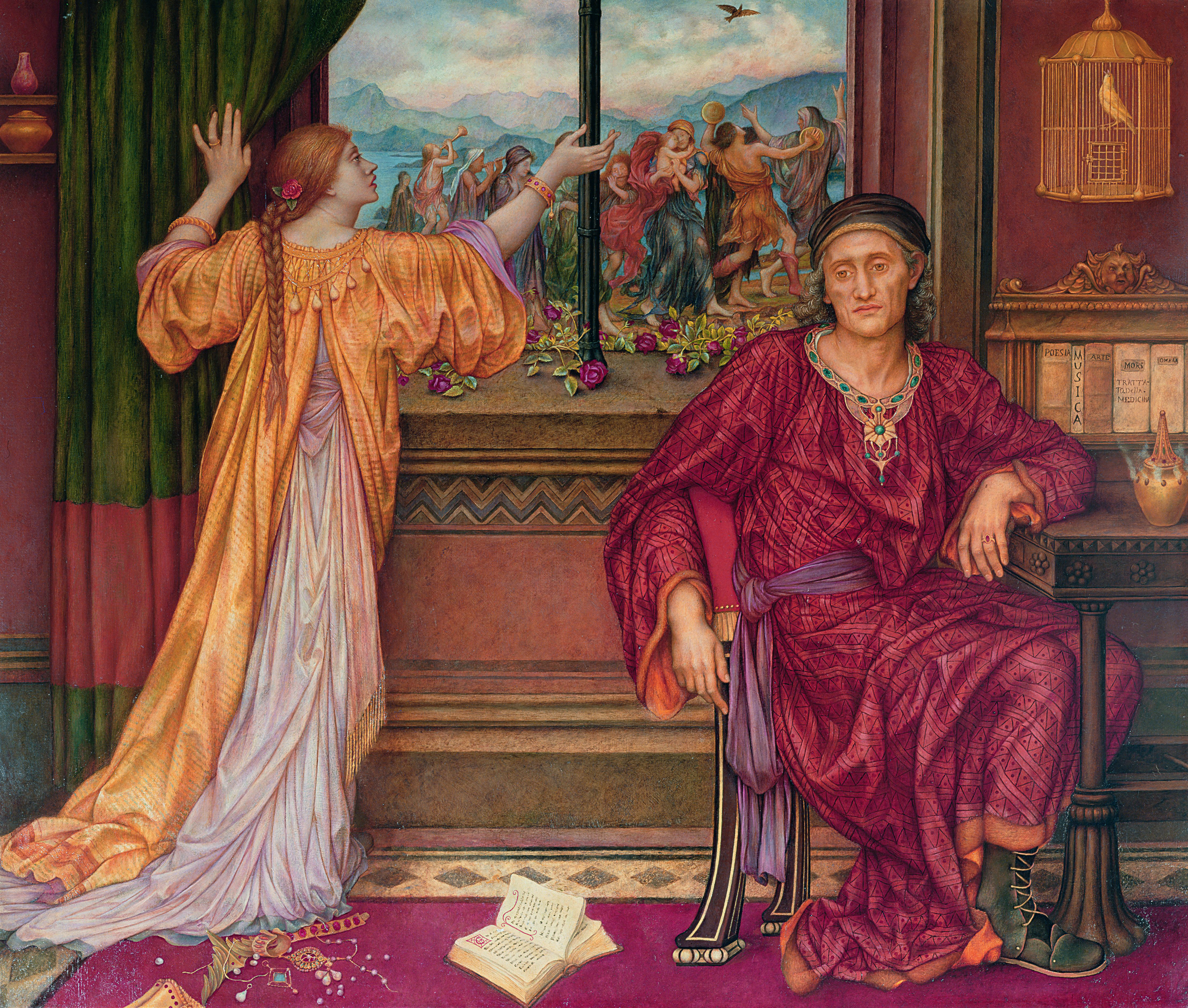
- Artist: Evelyn De Morgan
- Year: 1901-1902
- Medium: Oil on canvas
- Dimensions: 78.5 cm × 105 cm (30.9 in × 41 in)
- Location: Watts Gallery, Compton

The Gilded Cage is an oil painting on canvas by the English painter Evelyn De Morgan, from 1901 to 1902: it is on loan from the De Morgan Collection to the Watts Gallery.

== Description ==
In the painting, a woman looks out of a window. Her outstretched hand forms a gesture of yearning as she watches a group of dancers and musicians. The principal figure among the travelling group is a woman who dances while holding her baby, suggesting that the scene also represents maternal duty. Broken jewellery and a book lie on the floor.

A bird soars free above the dancers, which contrasts sharply to the captive bird in the gilded cage hanging near the woman's distraught older husband.
