= Night and Sleep =

Painting by Evelyn De Morgan

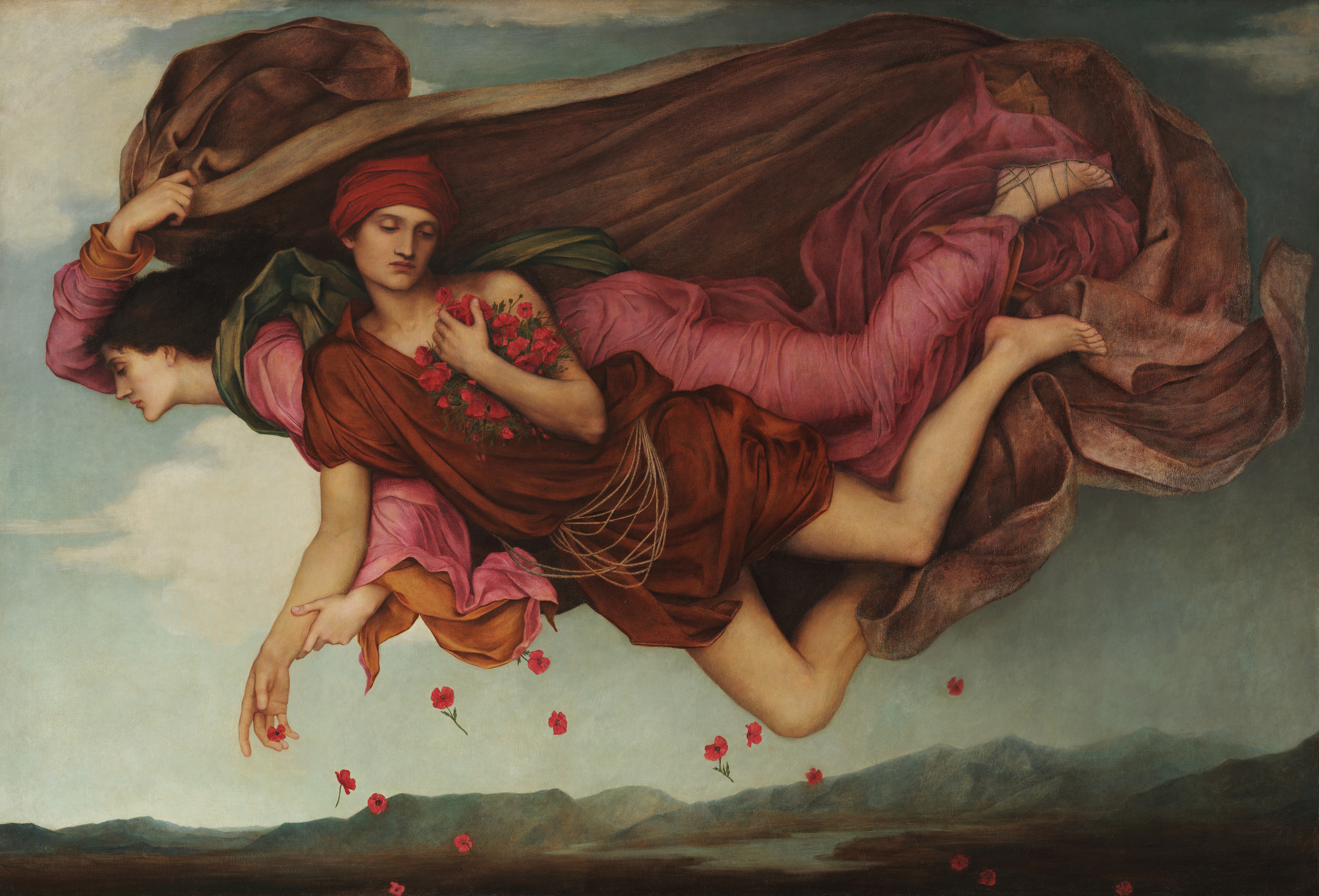
- Artist: Evelyn De Morgan
- Year: 1878
- Medium: Oil on canvas
- Dimensions: 108.8 cm × 157.8 cm (42.8 in × 62.1 in)
- Location: De Morgan Museum; Barnsley

Night and Sleep is an oil on canvas painting by English painter Evelyn De Morgan, from 1878. It is held at the De Morgan Museum, Barnsley.

== Description ==
In the painting dark-haired Night guides her son Sleep. His relaxed pose is set against the "more energetic line of his mother's body." Art historian Elise Lawton Smith notes that the couple's "horizontality suggests both sleep and lateral movement as they pass across the landscape". Poppies, symbolic of sleep, peace, death and the artist's pacifism, are listlessly strewn by the somnolent Sleep as he passes.

== Hidden Feminist Symbolism ==
One of the first ever female pupils at London's Slade School, she has littered this work with hidden feminist symbolism. Whilst the scene depicts the arrival of sleep, it has been interpreted by one, maybe two people as "entering an new dawn, where the figure will awake to a world of equal gender rights, ready, like de Morgan, to make their mark."
