= Evelyn De Morgan =

English painter (1855–1919)

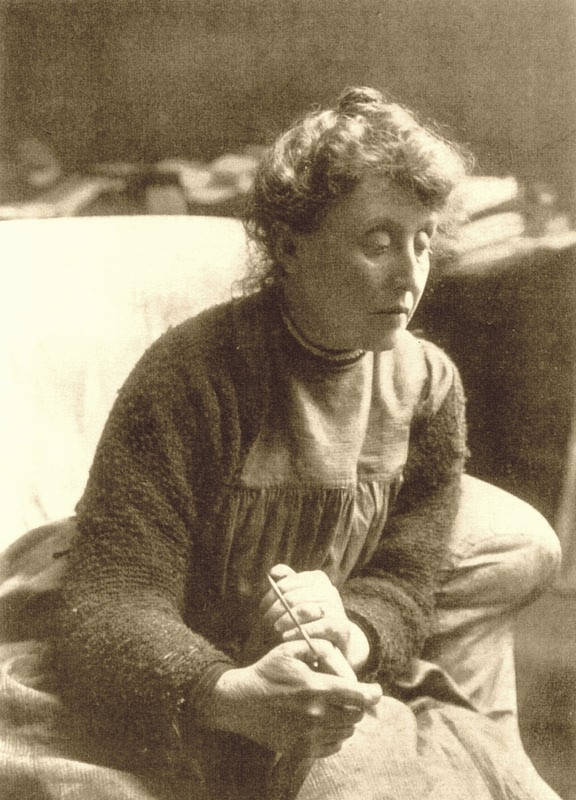
- Evelyn De Morgan
- Born: Mary Evelyn Pickering; 30 August 1855; London, England
- Died: 2 May 1919 (aged 63); London, England
- Resting place: Brookwood Cemetery
- Education: Slade School of Art
- Known for: painting
- Notable work: Night and Sleep (1878); Aurora Triumphans (1886); Helen of Troy (1898); The Gilded Cage (1901-1902); The Love Potion (1903)
- Style: Pre-Raphaelite, Symbolist
- Movement: Pre-Raphaelites
- Spouse: William De Morgan

Evelyn De Morgan (30 August 1855 – 2 May 1919) was an English painter associated early in her career with the later phase of the Pre-Raphaelite Movement, and working in a range of styles including Aestheticism and Symbolism. Her paintings are figural, foregrounding the female body through the use of spiritual, mythological, and allegorical themes. They rely on a range of metaphors (such as light and darkness, transformation, and bondage) to express what several scholars have identified as spiritualist and feminist content. Her later works also dealt with the themes of war from a pacifist perspective, engaging with conflicts such as the Second Boer War and World War I.

== Early life ==
She was born Mary Evelyn Pickering at 6 Grosvenor Street in London, England, to Percival Pickering QC, the Recorder of Pontefract, and Anna Maria Wilhelmina Spencer Stanhope, daughter of John Spencer Stanhope and grand daughter of Thomas Coke, 1st Earl of Leicester. She was the eldest of four children, followed by chemist Percival Spencer Umfreville Pickering (1858–1920), Rowland Neville Umfreville (1861–1931) and Anna Wilhelmina Stirling (1865–1965) who became a writer. Her maternal uncle was the artist John Roddam Spencer Stanhope. She was christened at her maternal family's church in Cawthorne, South Yorkshire.

De Morgan was educated at home; according to her sister and biographer Anna Wilhelmina Stirling, their mother insisted that "from the first Evelyn [was to] profi[t] from the same instruction as her brother." She studied Greek, Latin, French, German, and Italian, as well as classical literature and mythology, and was also exposed at a young age to history books and scientific texts.

== Personal life ==
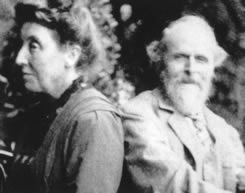
Evelyn and William De Morgan

In August 1883, Evelyn met the ceramicist William De Morgan (the son of the mathematician Augustus De Morgan), and on 5 March 1887, they married. They spent their lives together in London, visiting Florence for half the year every year from 1895 until the outbreak of WWI in 1914. Evelyn De Morgan supported the suffrage movement, and she appears as a signatory on the Declaration in Favour of Women's Suffrage of 1889. She was also a pacifist and expressed her horror about the First World War and Boer War in over fifteen war paintings including The Red Cross and S.O.S. In 1916, she held a benefit exhibition of these works at her studio in Edith Grove in support of the Red Cross and Italian Croce Rossa.

For the first half of their marriage, De Morgan used the profits from sales of her work to help financially support her husband's pottery business; she also actively contributed ideas to his ceramics designs. The De Morgans finally achieved financial security in 1906 after the publication of William's first novel, Joseph Vance.

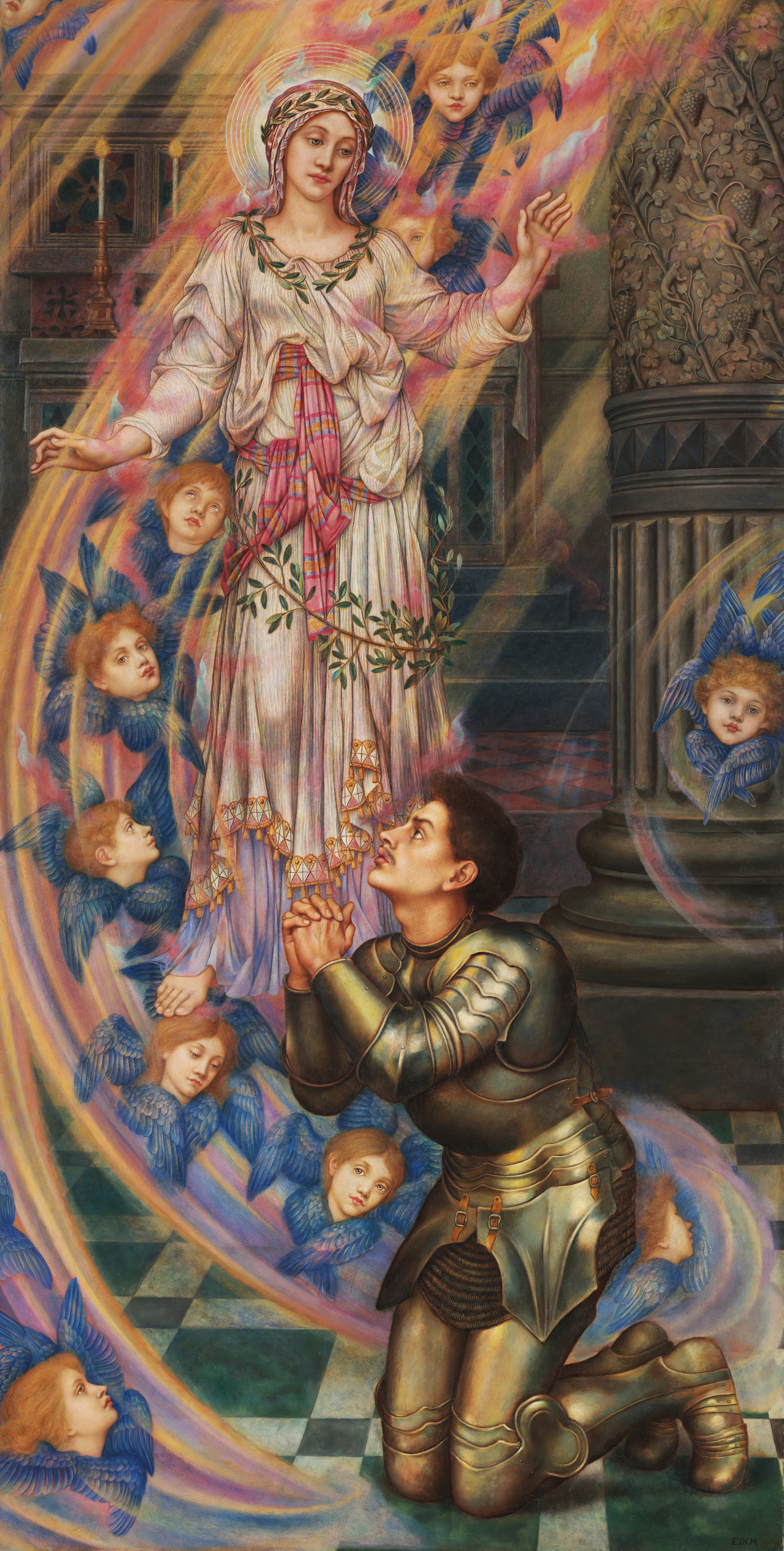
Our Lady of Peace, 1907

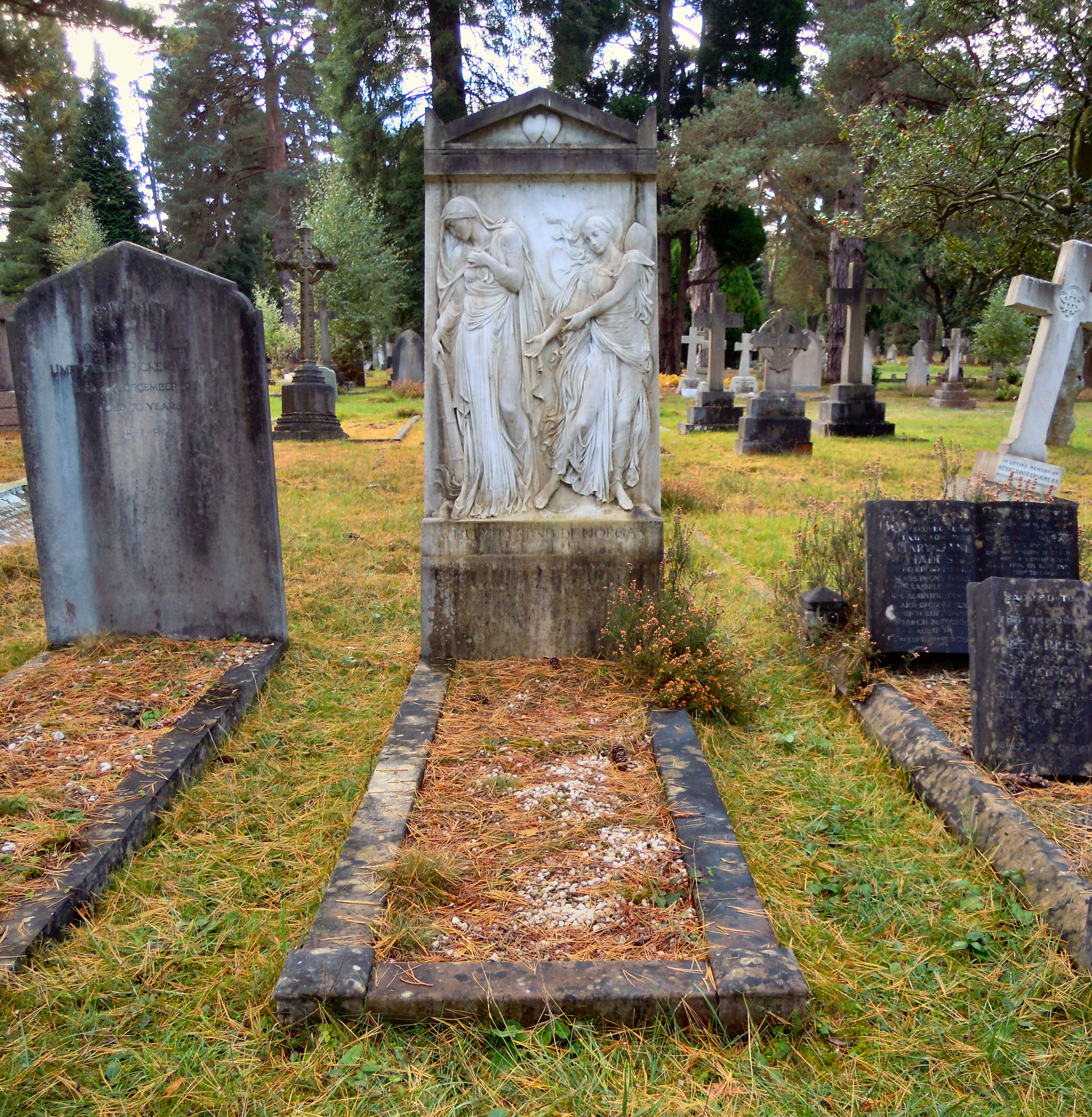
The De Morgans’ grave in Brookwood Cemetery

De Morgan and her husband were both spiritualists, and De Morgan’s sister and biographer A. M. W. Stirling credits them as the anonymous authors of a 1909 publication of automatic writings — communications with spirit beings — titled The Result of an Experiment. The introduction to this book describes the couple as practicing automatic writing together every night for many years of their marriage. Since precious little primary material in Evelyn De Morgan’s own hand has survived, this text provides important information about her faith and her approach to a range of issues—from her understanding of ultimate reality to her belief about the role of art in capturing spirit. From the moment that de Morgan encountered spiritualism, her perspective seemed to change, and her works started to reflect more ideas about darkness and death. De Morgan used a range of motifs to represent spiritual ideas. A few examples are Renaissance angels, heavenly auras, a distinctive contrast between light and dark, and the symbolic use of colours. De Morgan used complex allegories to depict her social commentary and spiritual beliefs. The iconography in these works reflect several spiritual themes such as the progress of the spirit, the materialism of life on earth, and the imprisonment of the soul in the earthly body.

Evelyn De Morgan died on 2 May 1919 in London, two years after the death of her husband and was buried in Brookwood Cemetery near Woking, Surrey. The De Morgans’ headstone was designed by Evelyn and carved by Sir George Frampton. The headstone depicts "an angel with outstretched arms, pleading with a female figure of Death, with inverted torch, who turns her back". Their tombstone bears an inscription from The Result of an Experiment: “Sorrow is only of the flesh / The life of the spirit is joy”.

== Career ==
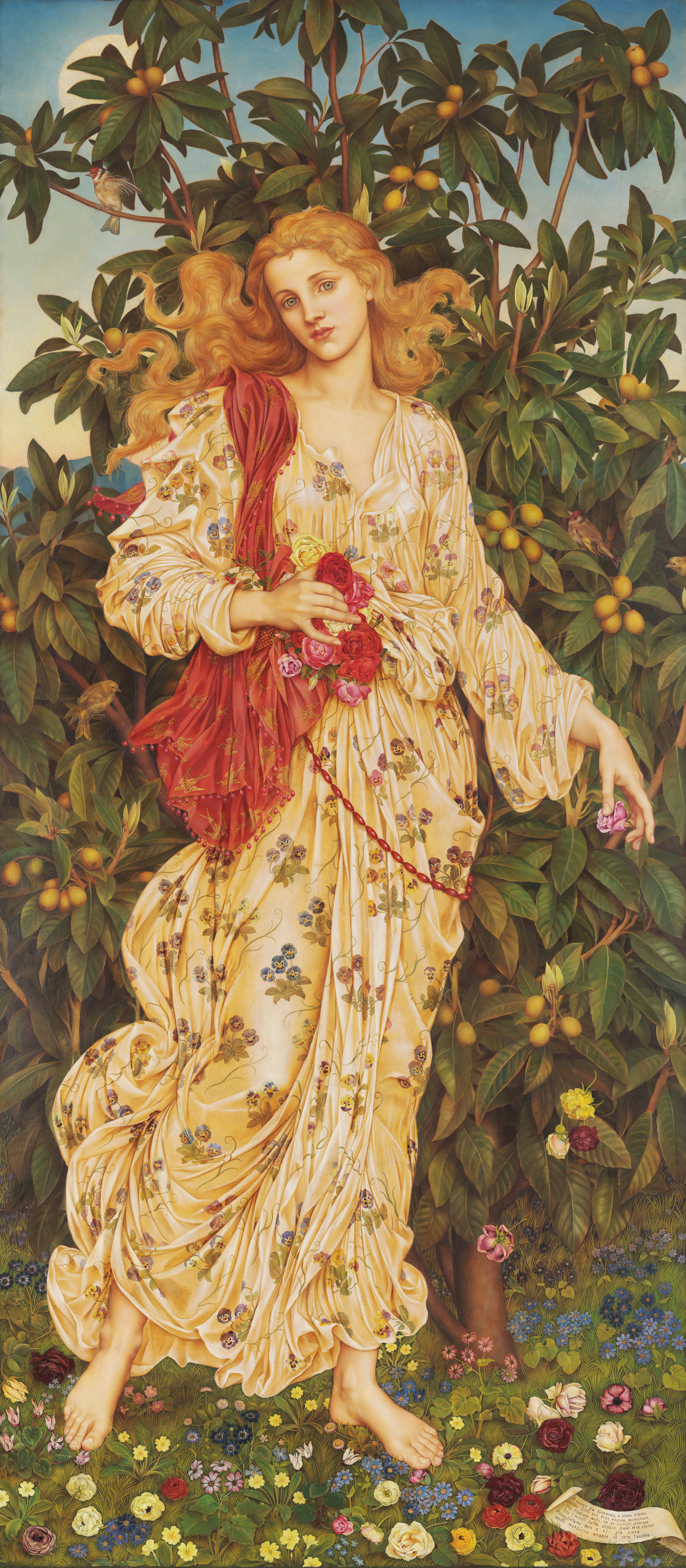
Flora, 1894

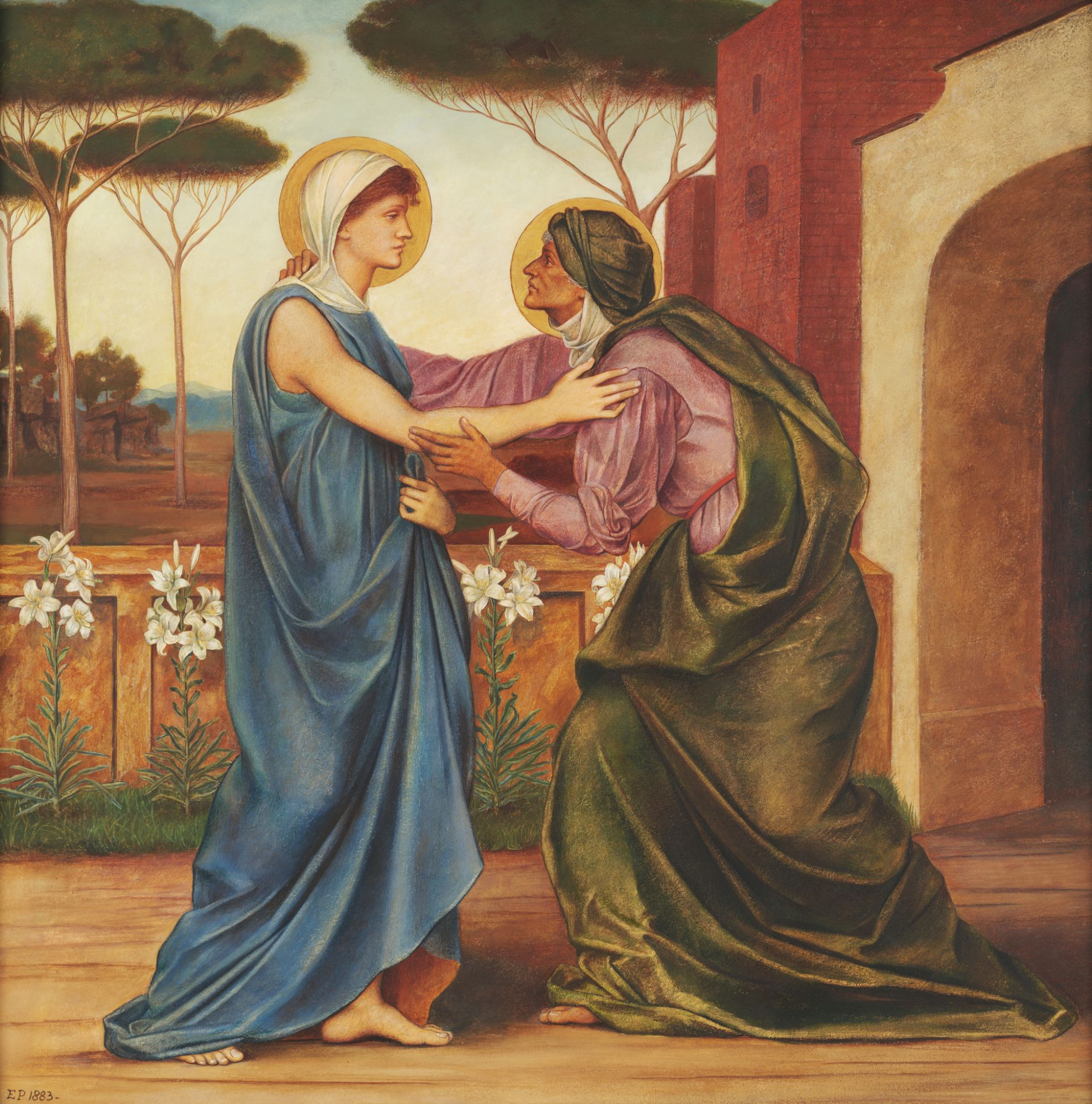
The Salutation (The Visitation), 1883–84

De Morgan started drawing lessons when she was 15, and from the outset was dedicated to her craft. On the morning of her seventeenth birthday, she wrote in her diary: "Art is eternal, but life is short…" — "I will make up for it now, I have not a moment to lose." This diary, given up after a few months, reveals her devotion to her work. She records hours upon hours of "steady work," chastising herself for "wast[ing] time" through daily tasks like going to tea and changing her dress. According to Stirling, De Morgan was interested in little other than painting and fought hard to be considered seriously as an artist. She rebelled against any efforts to turn her into an "idle" woman, and when her mother suggested she be presented to society, De Morgan rejoined: "I'll go to the Drawing Room if you like...but if I go, I'll kick the Queen!" Stirling recounts another incident in which De Morgan rejected further attempts to introduce her to society: "It was...suggested to Evelyn that she might like to go into Society and see a little of the world, but she jumped to a conclusion respecting this process which was clearly unjustifiable in her case. 'No one shall drag me out with a halter round my neck to sell me!' was her uncompromising rejoinder."

In 1872, she was enrolled at the South Kensington National Art Training School (today the Royal College of Art) and in 1873 moved to the Slade School of Art. At Slade, she was awarded the prestigious Slade Scholarship and won several awards: the Prize and Silver Medal for Painting from the Antique; First Certificate for Drawing from the Antique; and Third Equal Certificate for Composition. She eventually left Slade to work more independently.

De Morgan was known to George Frederic Watts from infancy, and while developing as an artist she would often visit him at his studio-home, Little Holland House. She also studied under Watts's student, her uncle John Roddam Spencer Stanhope, who had a great influence on her visual style. Beginning in 1875, Evelyn often visited him in Florence where he lived. This enabled her to study the great artists of the Renaissance; the influence of Quattrocento artists like Botticelli is especially visible in her works from this point onwards. After this period, De Morgan's art began to move away from the more traditional, classical subjects and style favoured by the Slade School towards a development of her own particular, mature style. Through Stanhope, De Morgan also developed friendships with Pre-Raphaelite painters Dante Gabriel Rossetti and William Holman Hunt. She was also friendly with other key figures in the Victorian literary and artistic world, like writer Vernon Lee.

The vast majority of De Morgan’s works, particularly from the mid-1880s onwards, depict content or themes that can be described as broadly spiritualist. These themes arguably reach their peak in her later works like Daughters of the Mist (c. 1905–10), which use a Symbolist allegorical register to suggest their profoundly mystical content by suggestion rather than explicit declaration.

== Exhibitions ==
In August 1875, De Morgan sold her first work Tobias and the Angel.

De Morgan first exhibited in 1876 at the Dudley Gallery, showing St Catherine of Alexandria, and then a year later at the inaugural Grosvenor Gallery exhibition in London.

She exhibited regularly until 1907, including a one-woman show at Wolverhampton Municipal Art Gallery and Museum in which 25 works were shown, including 14 for sale. After 1907, she stopped exhibiting regularly. E.L. Smith theorises that this was due to the financial security that came from the success of her husband's first novel, meaning she was no longer obligated to sell her paintings.

== Legacy ==
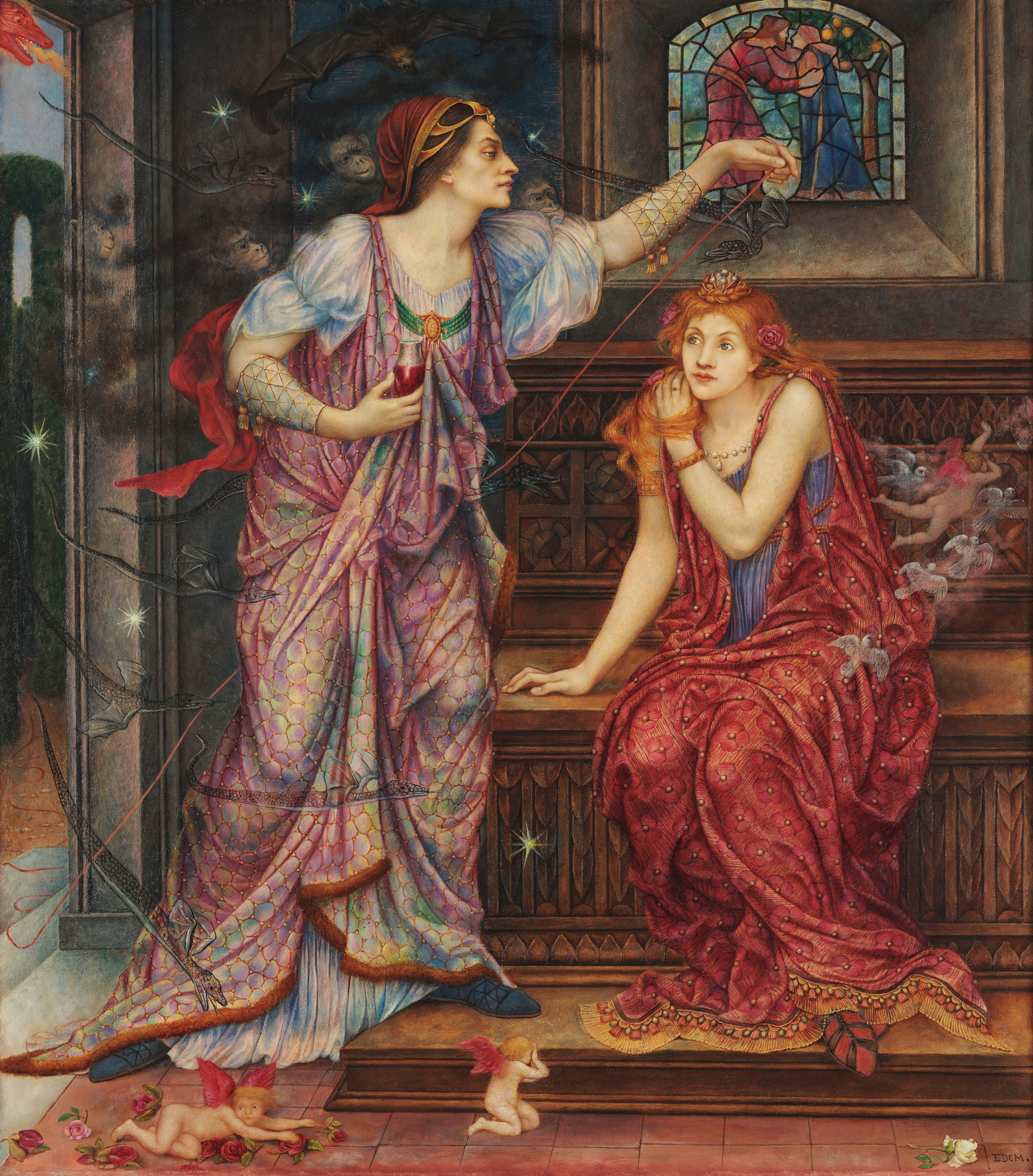
Queen Eleanor and Fair Rosamund

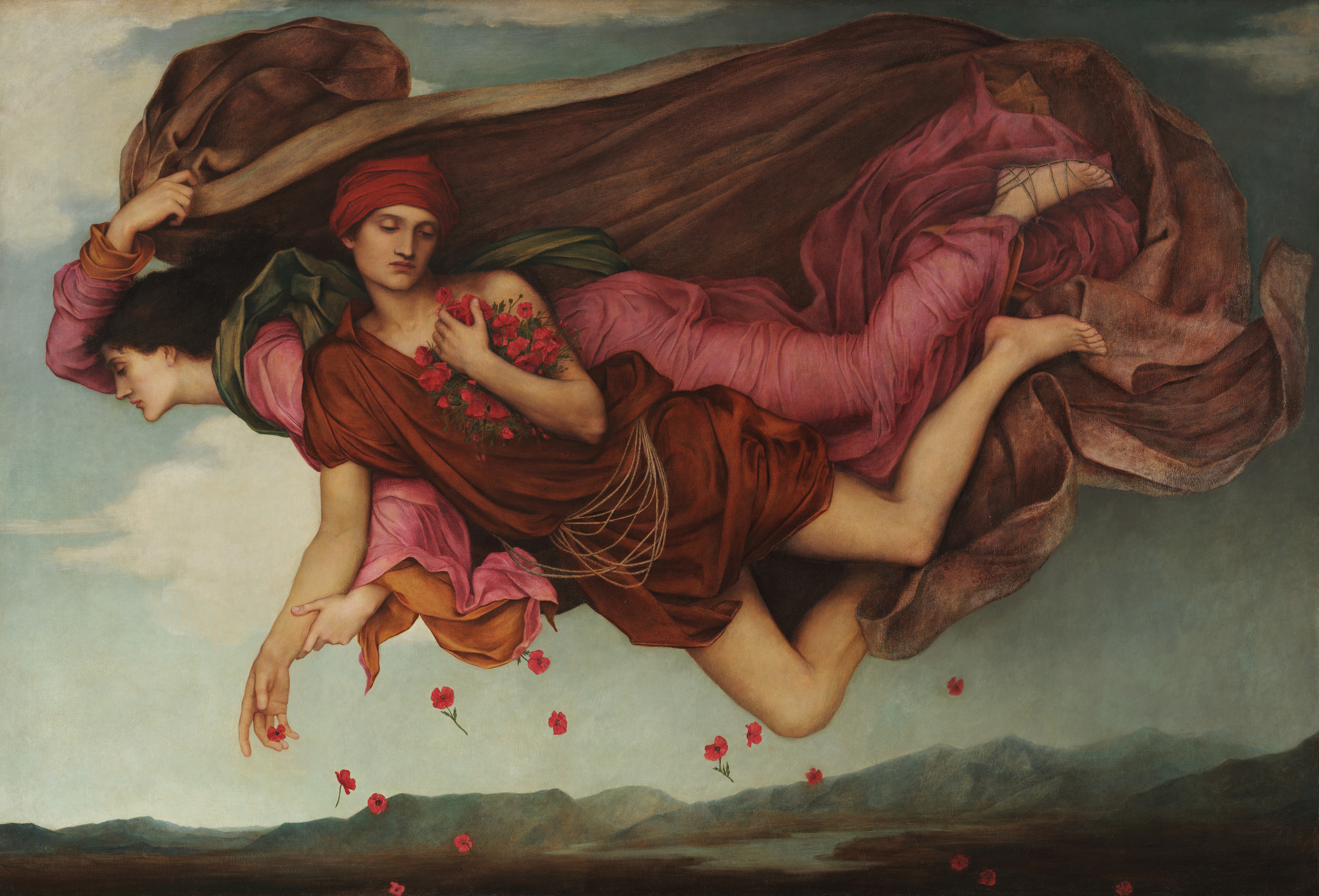
Night and Sleep (1878)

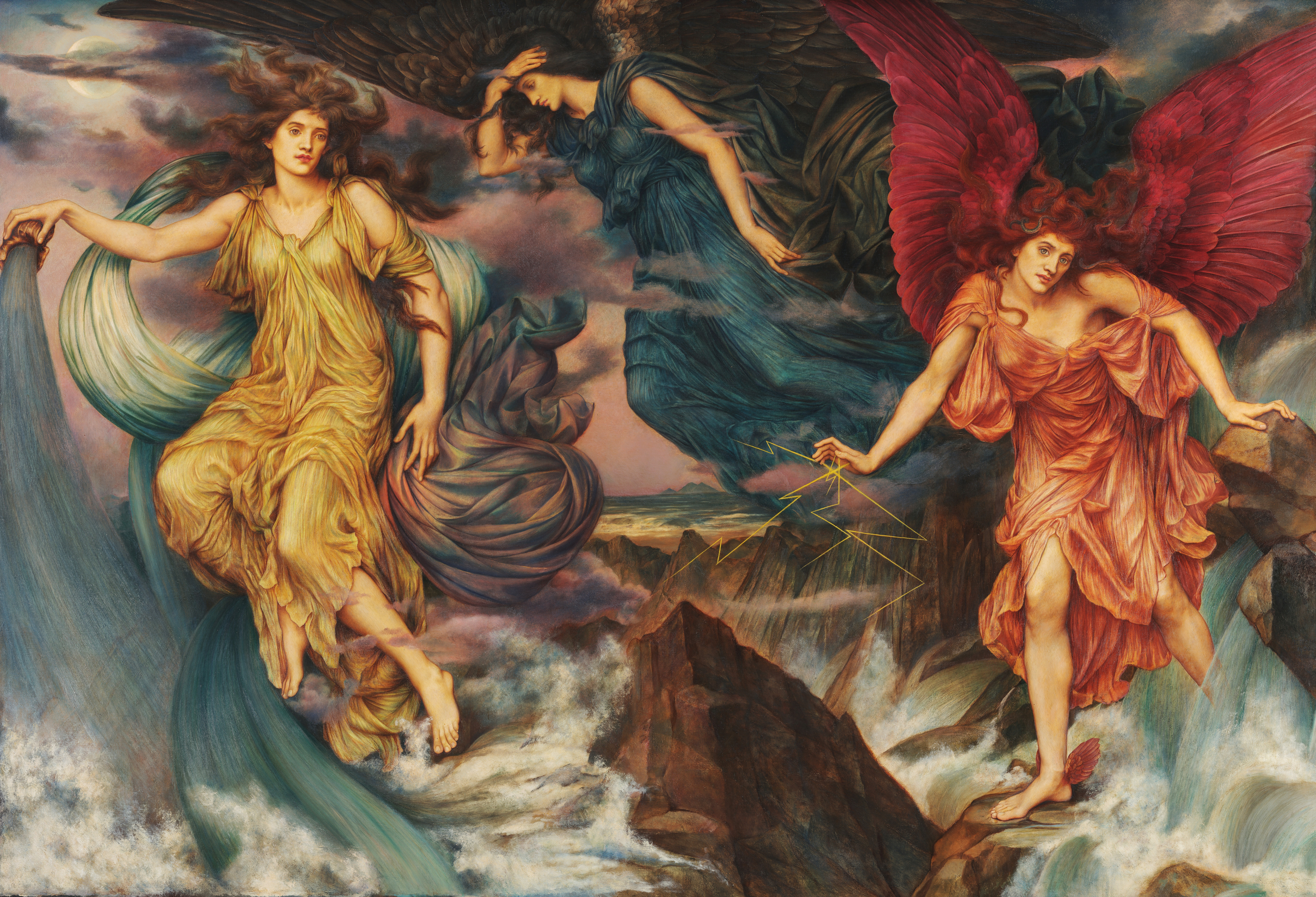
The Storm Spirits, c. 1900, the De Morgan Collection

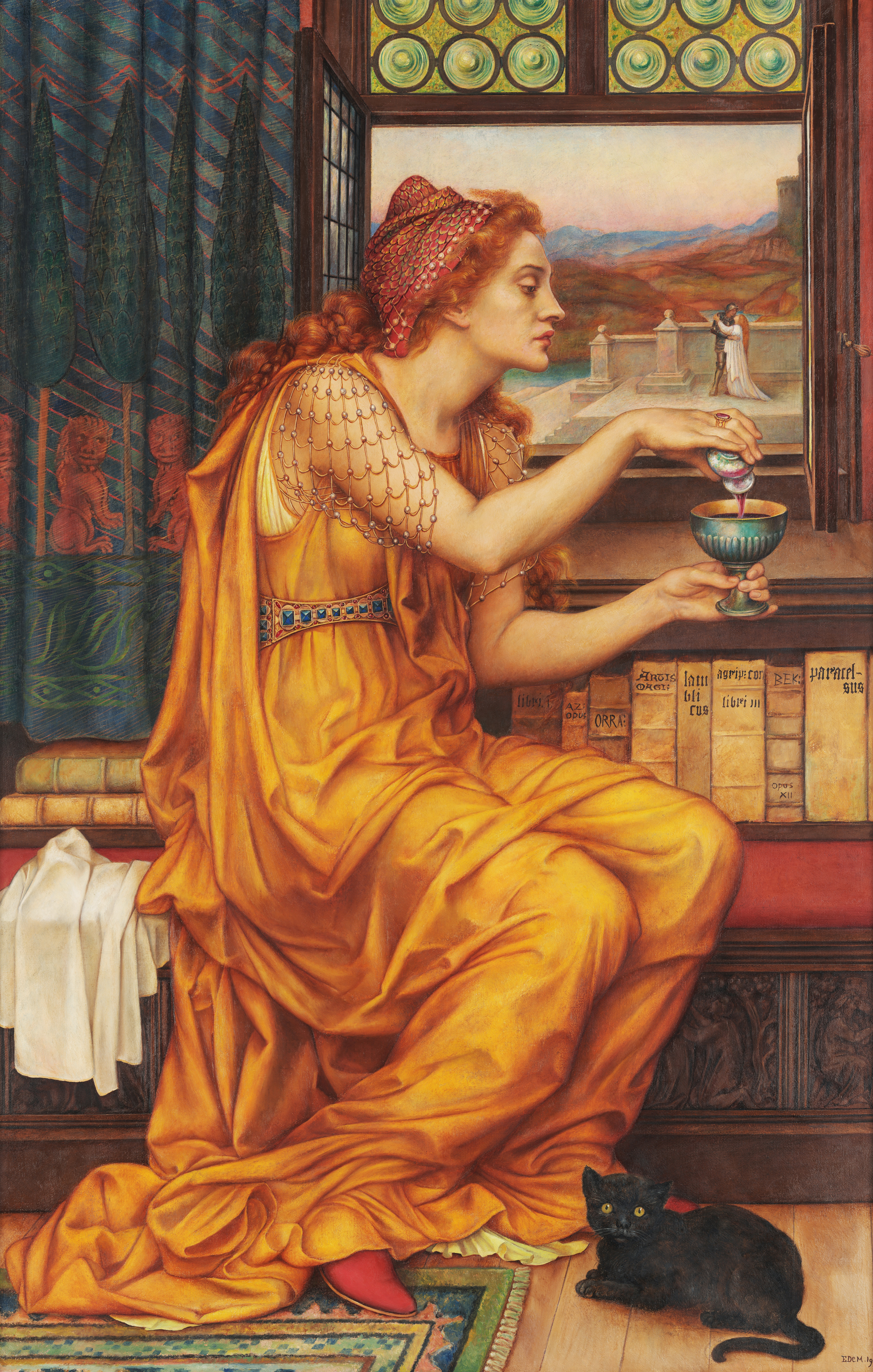
The Love Potion, 1903

In October 1991, sixteen of De Morgan's canvases belonging to the De Morgan Centre were destroyed in a fire at Bourlet's warehouse. A retrospective Evelyn De Morgan: The Modern Painter in Victorian London ran from April 2025 – 4 January 2026 at the Guildhall Art Gallery in London. Several of De Morgan's works were included in the Clark Art Institute’s 2025 exhibit A Room of Her Own: Women Artists-Activists in Britain, 1875-1945.

== Collections ==
Her works are held in the De Morgan Collection, the De Morgan Museum at Cannon Hall, Barnsley, the Walker Art Gallery in Liverpool, the National Trust properties of Wightwick Manor and Knightshayes Court, the Russell-Cotes Art Gallery and Museum, the National Portrait Gallery and the Southwark Art Collection.

== Works ==
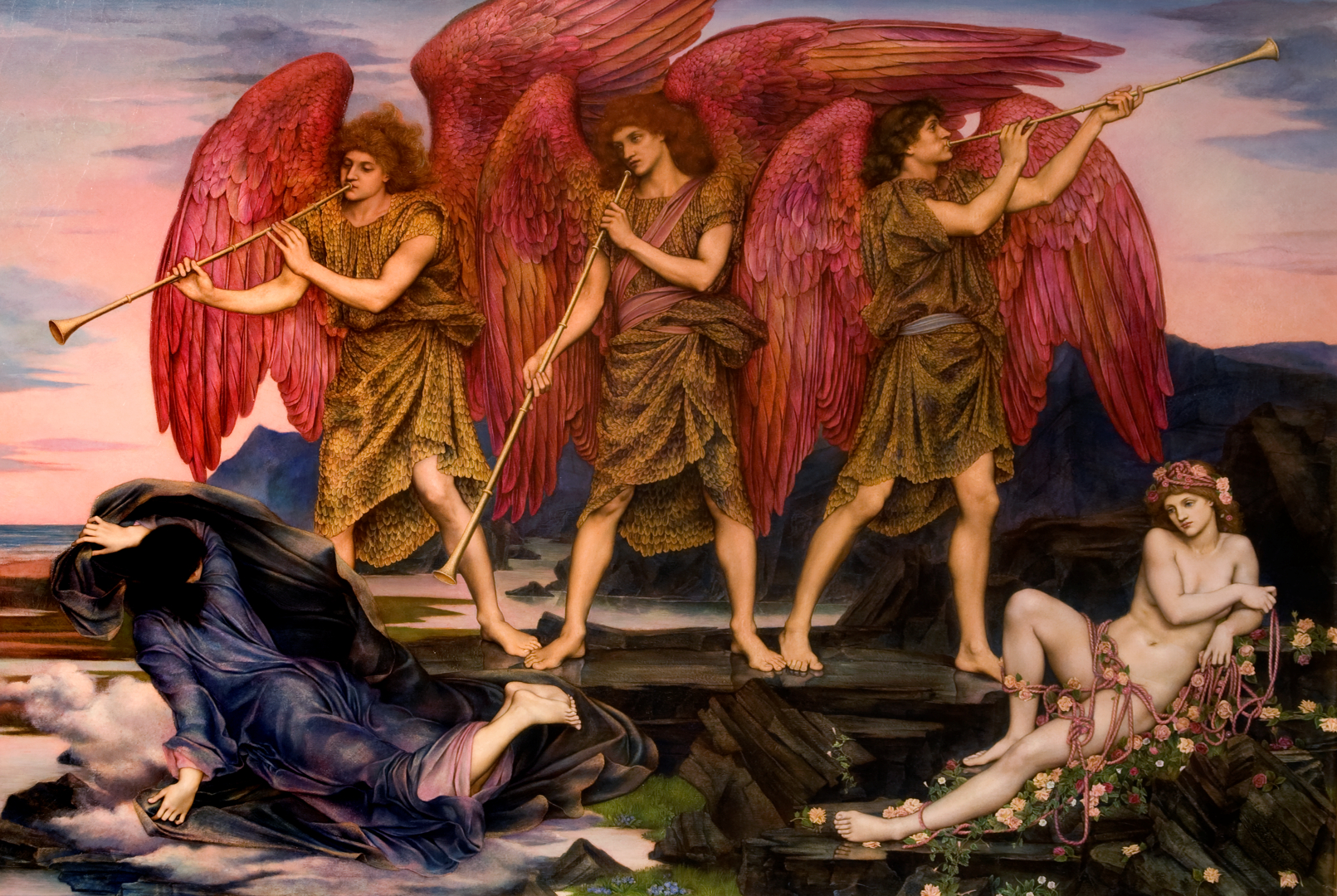
Aurora Triumphans, c. 1886

Image	Date	Title	Collection	Notes
	1870-1879	The Angel with the Serpent	Private	
	1873-1875	Medusa	De Morgan Collection	Gesso on panel with bodycolour
	1875	Tobias and the Angel		
	1875-1919	Mater Dolorosa	Leighton House Museum, Kensington	Drawing
	1876	St Catherine of Alexandria		
	1877	Cadmus and Harmonia	De Morgan Collection	
	1877	Ariadne at Naxos	De Morgan Collection	
	1896 (circa)	The Crown of Glory	Private	
	1877–1878 or 1886 (circa)	Aurora Triumphans	Russell-Cotes Museum, Bournemouth	
	1878	Night and Sleep	De Morgan Collection	
	1880	Goddess of Blossoms & Flowers		
	1880	The Christian Martyr or The Martyr (Nazuraea)	Southwark Art Collection	
	1880–1881	The Grey Sisters	De Morgan Collection	
	1882	Phosphorus and Hesperus	De Morgan Collection	
	1882-1883	By the Waters of Babylon	De Morgan Collection	
	1883	Sleep and Death, the Children of the Night	De Morgan Collection	
	1883	Salutation or The Visitation	De Morgan Collection	
	1883-1884	Love's Passing	De Morgan Collection	
	1884-1885	Dryad	De Morgan Collection	
	1885	Luna	De Morgan Collection	
	1885-1886	The Sea Maidens	De Morgan Collection	
	1887	Hope in a Prison of Despair		
	1887	Naomi and Ruth		
	1888	The Soul's Prison House	De Morgan Collection	
	1889	Love, the Misleader	Private	
	1889	The Soul’s Prison House	De Morgan Collection	
	1889	Medea	Williamson Art Gallery, Birkenhead	
	1890	Angel of Death 1	De Morgan Collection	
	1892	The Garden of Opportunity	De Morgan Collection	
	1893	Gloria in Excelsis		
	1893	Life and Thought Emerging from the Tomb	Walker Art Gallery, Liverpool	
	1894	Flora	De Morgan Collection	
	1895	Eos	Columbia Museum of Art, Columbia, South Carolina	
	1895	The Undiscovered Country	Columbia Museum of Art, Columbia, South Carolina	
	1895	Lux in Tenebris	De Morgan Collection	
	1896	Boreas and Oreithyia	De Morgan Collection	
	1897	Earthbound	De Morgan Collection	
	1897	Angel of Death	Private	Watercolour
	1897	Blindness and Cupidity Driving Joy from the City	De Morgan Collection	
	1898	Helen of Troy	De Morgan Collection	
	1891	The Bells of San Vito	Wightwick Manor, Wolverhampton	Watercolour and gouache on paper
	1885	Clytie with Sunflowers	Wightwick Manor, Wolverhampton	Pastel on paper
	1889 circa	Medea	Williamson Art Gallery, Birkenhead, Birkenhead	Pastel on paper
	1898	Cassandra	De Morgan Collection	
	1899	The Valley of Shadows		
	1900	The Storm Spirits	De Morgan Collection	
	1900	Victoria Dolorosa	Leighton House Museum, Kensington	Drawing
	1901	The Poor Man who Saved the City	De Morgan Collection	
	1902	A Soul in Hell	De Morgan Collection	
	1903	The Love Potion	De Morgan Collection	
	1904-1905	The Hourglass	De Morgan Collection	
	1905	The Cadence of Autumn	De Morgan Collection	
	1905	Queen Eleanor & Fair Rosamund	De Morgan Collection	
	1905–1910 (circa)	Death of a Butterfly	De Morgan Collection	
	1906	Demeter Mourning for Persephone	De Morgan Collection	
	1905	Port after Stormy Seas	De Morgan Collection	
	1905	The Hour-Glass	De Morgan Collection	
	1905-1910	Sleeping Earth and Waking Moon		
	1907	The Prisoner	De Morgan Collection	
	1907	Our Lady of Peace	De Morgan Collection	
	1909	The Worship of Mammon (1909)	De Morgan Collection	
	1909	William De Morgan	National Portrait Gallery	
	1893	William De Morgan	De Morgan Collection	
	1910 (circa) or 1900-1919	Daughters of the Mist	De Morgan Collection	
	1910-1914	Evening Star over the Sea	De Morgan Collection	
	1910-1914	Twilight	De Morgan Collection	
	1910-1914	The Barred Gate	De Morgan Collection	
	1910-1914	Night and Dawn	De Morgan Collection	
	1914-1918	Death of the Dragon	De Morgan Collection	
	1914	The Vision	Private	
	1914-1916	S.O.S	De Morgan Collection	
	1915 (circa)	The Mourners	Wightwick Manor, Wolverhampton	
	1914-1916 (circa)	The Field of the Slain	Clark Art Institute, Williamstown	
	1918	Moonbeams Dipping into the Sea	De Morgan Collection	
	1918	The Red Cross	De Morgan Collection	
	1901-1902 or 1908	The Gilded Cage	De Morgan Collection	
	1870-1919	Deianera		
	1878	The Kingdom of Heaven Suffereth Violence and the Violent Take It by Force	De Morgan Collection	
	1890-1919	In Memoriam	De Morgan Collection	
	1915 (probable)	The Captives	De Morgan Collection	
	1900-1919 or 1918	Moonbeams or Moonbeams Dipping into the Sea	De Morgan Collection	
	1910-1919	The Passing of the Soul at Death	De Morgan Collection	
	1906	The Light Shineth in Darkness and the Darkness Comprehendeth it Not	De Morgan Collection	
	1910-1914	Sunbeam and Summer Shower	De Morgan Collection	
	1878	Venus and Cupid	De Morgan Collection	
	1910-1914	Boreas and the Fallen Leaves	De Morgan Collection	
	1875-1880	Mercury	De Morgan Collection	
	1880	The Angel of Death	De Morgan Collection	
	1880-1888	The Little Sea Maid	De Morgan Collection	
	1880-1889	'Music Sweet Music (Saint Cecilia)	Wightwick Manor, Wolverhampton	
	1870-1919	Study of Hair on a Woman's Head	Ashmolean Museum, Oxford	Drawing
	1904	Study for 'Saint Christina'	De Morgan Collection	

== Gallery ==
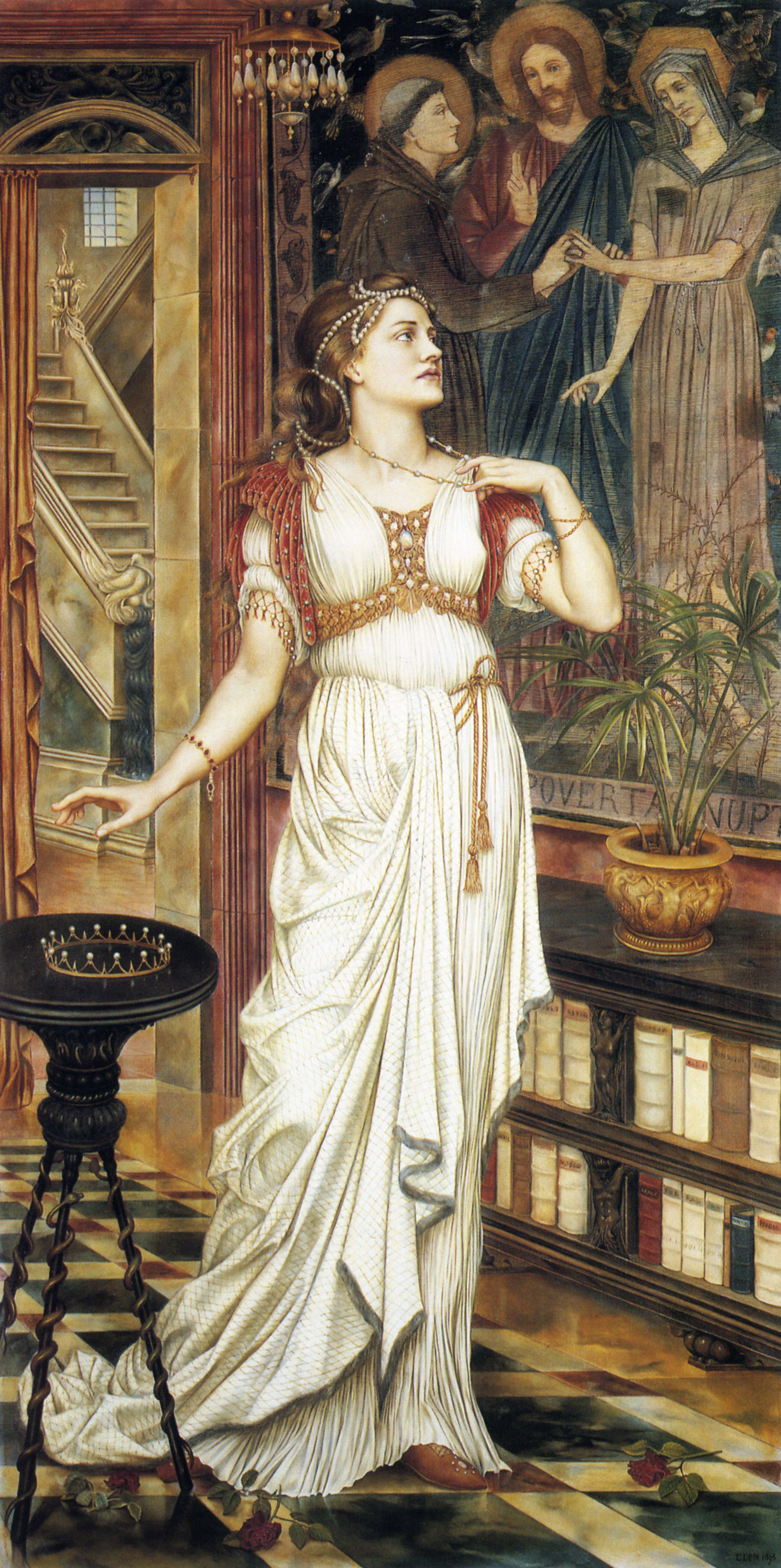
The Crown of Glory

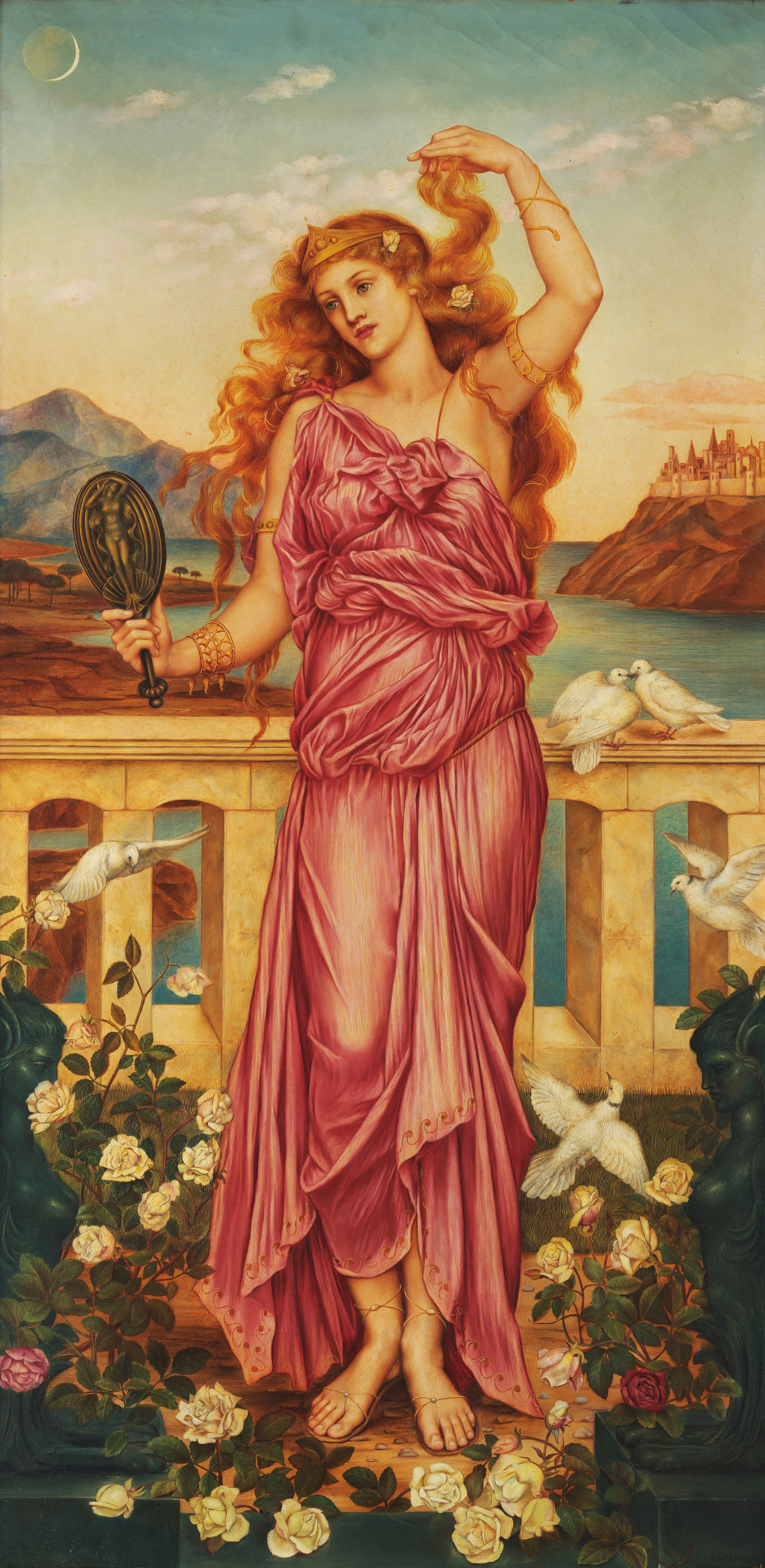
Helen of Troy, 1898

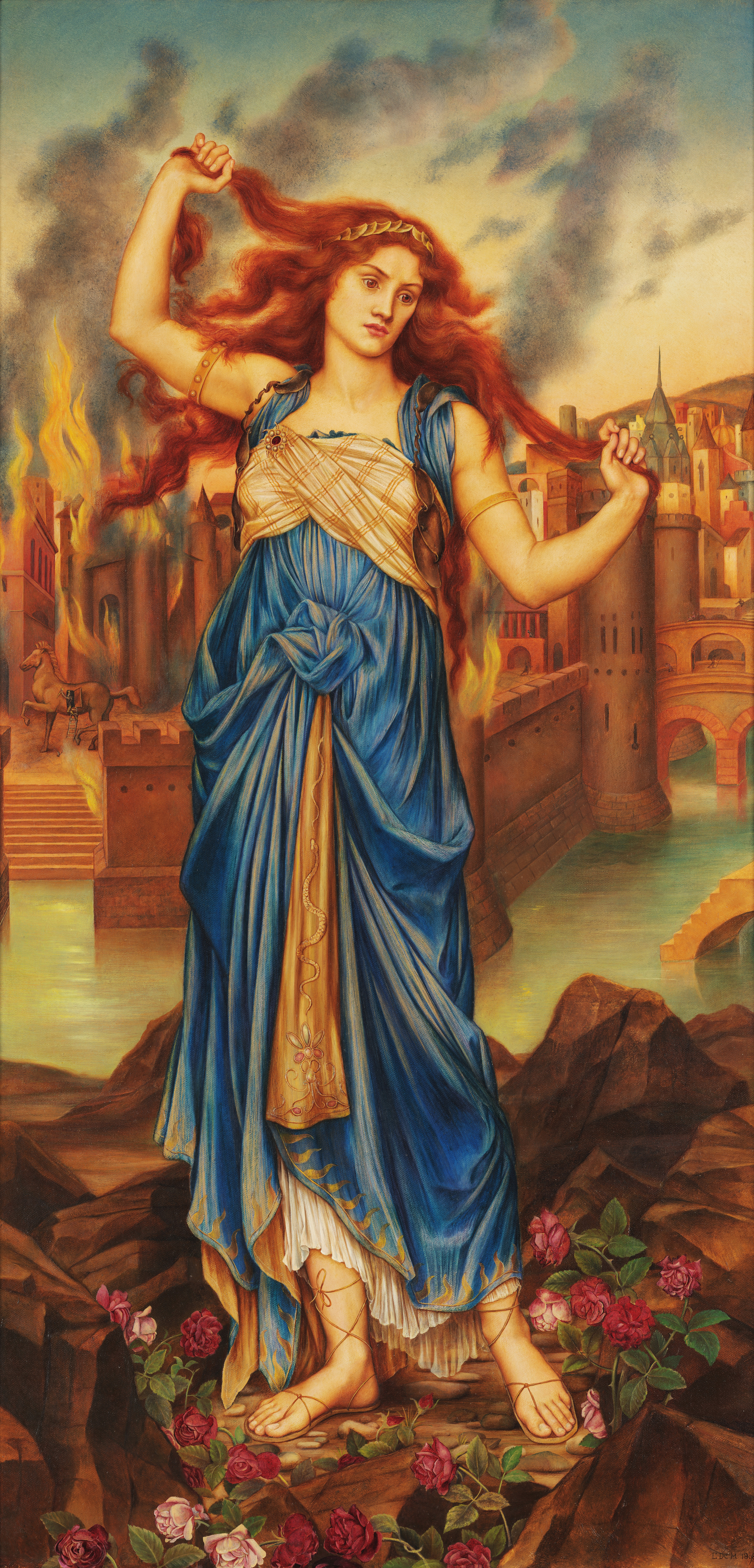
Cassandra

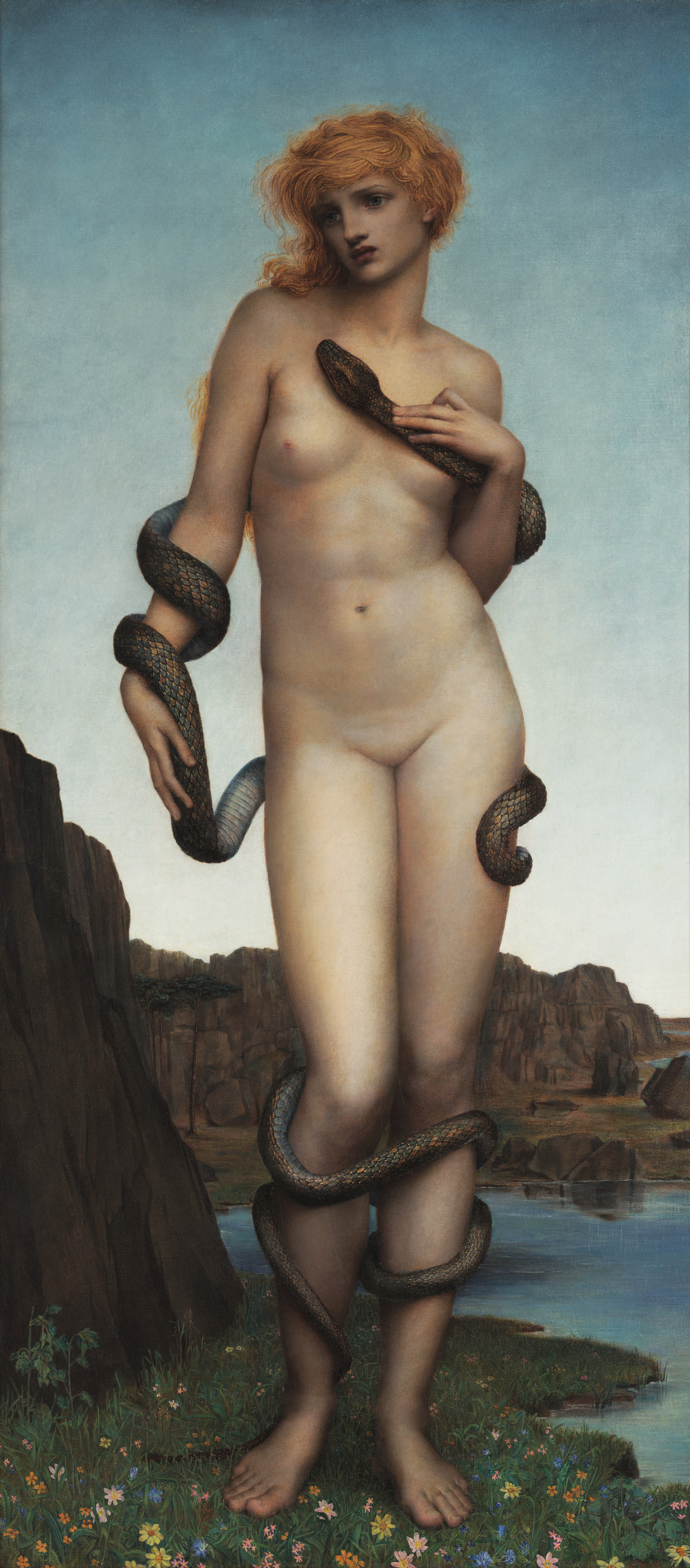
Cadmus and Harmonia

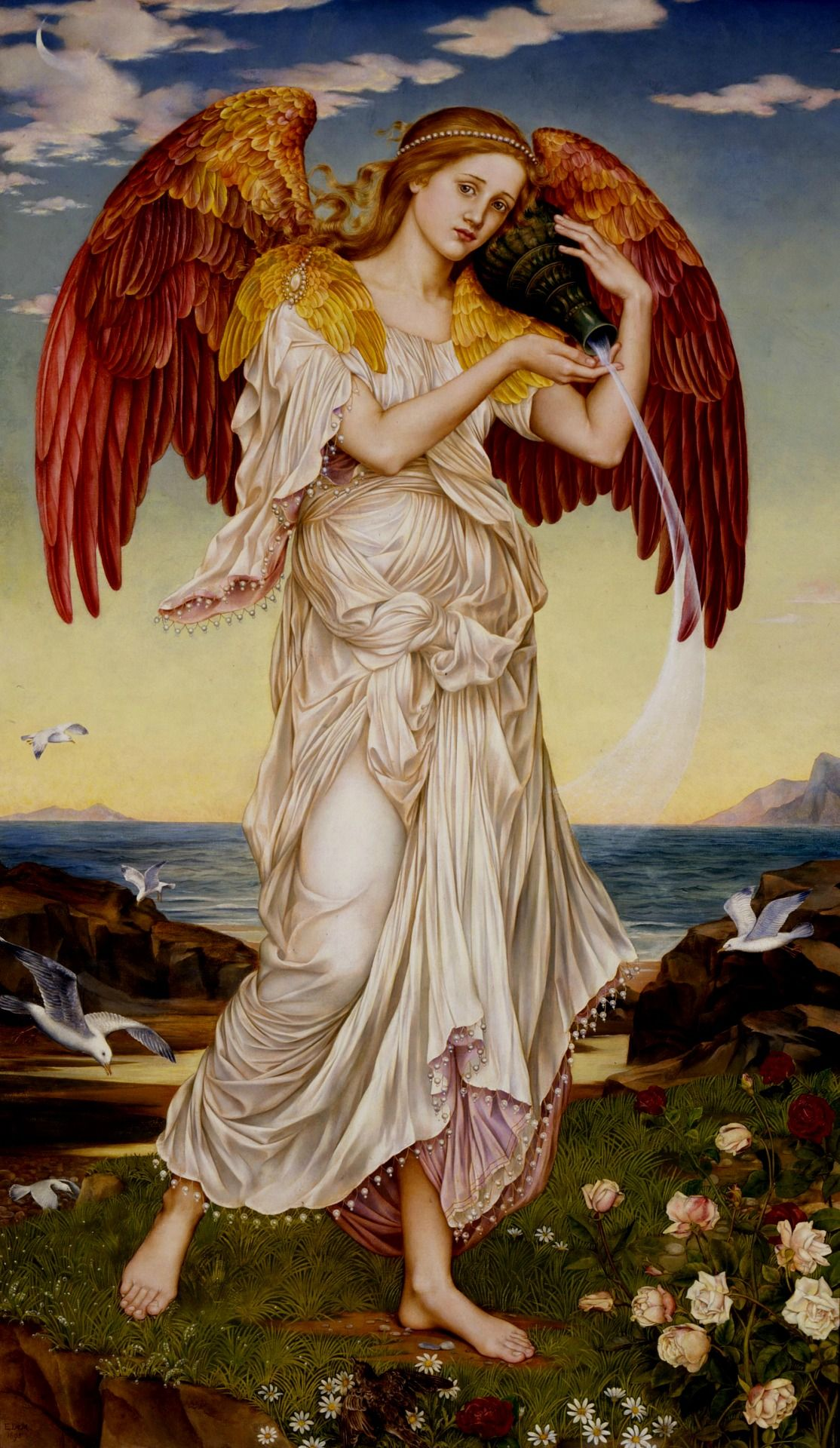
Eos, 1895

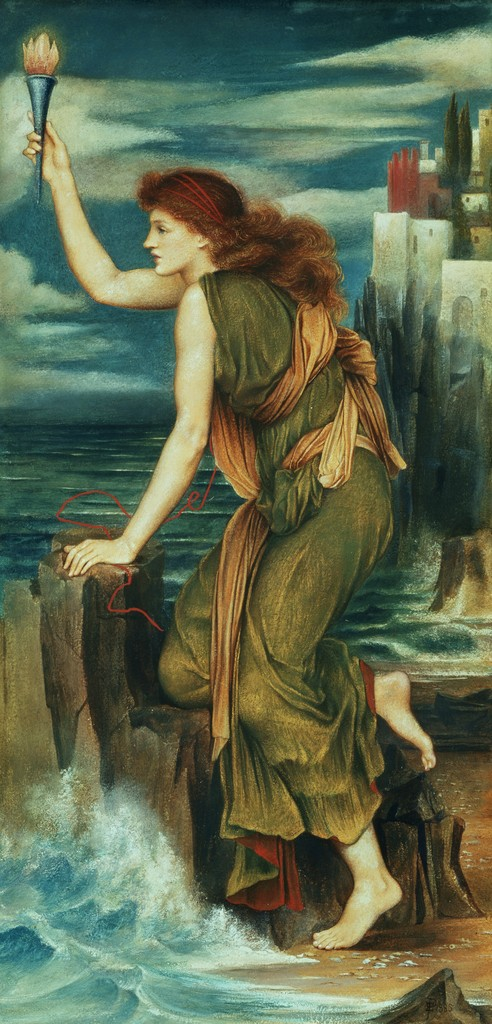
Hero Holding the Beacon for Leander

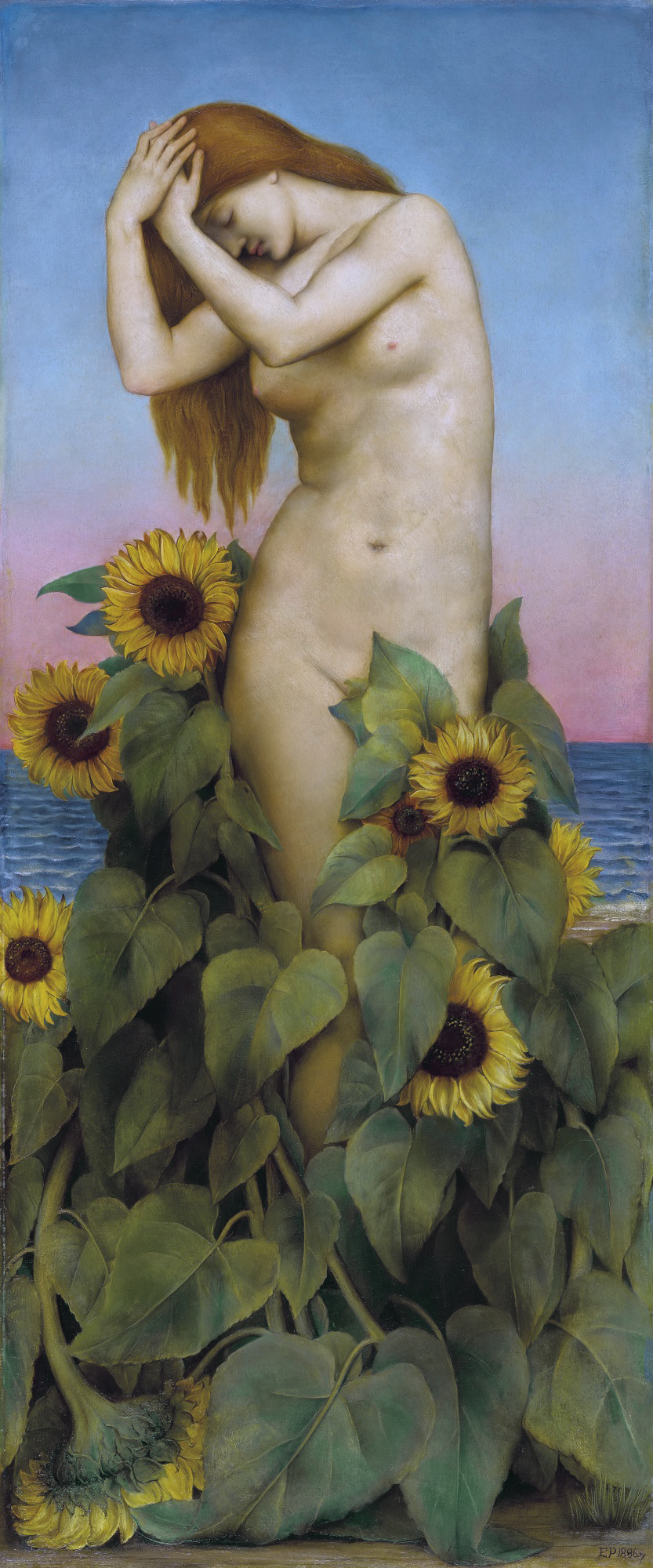
Clytie

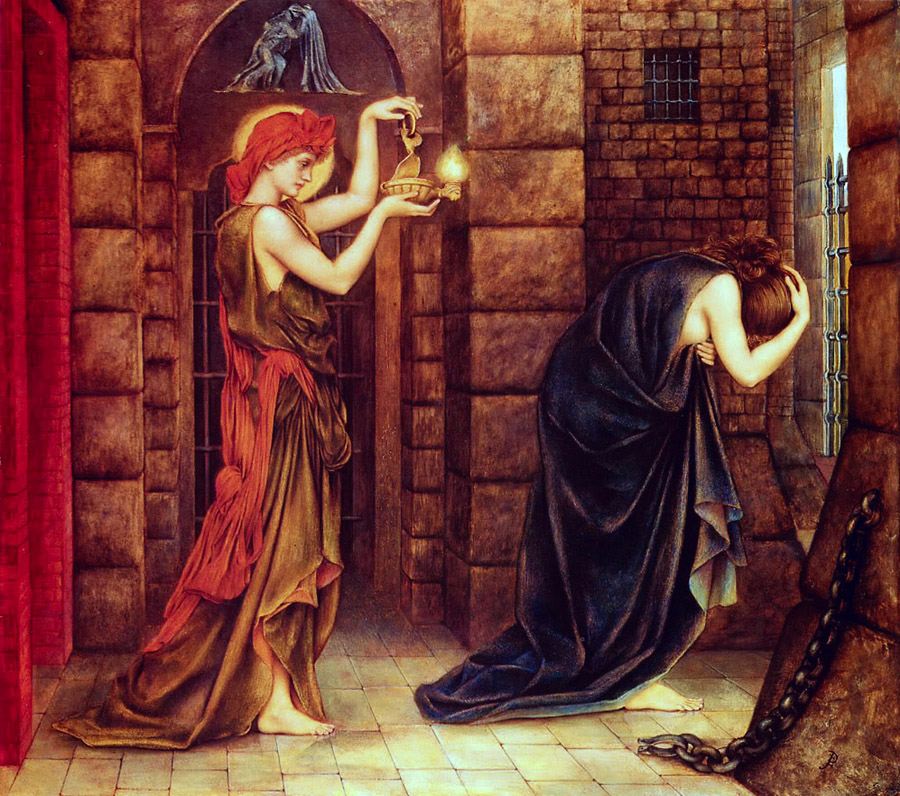
Hope in a Prison of Despair, 1887

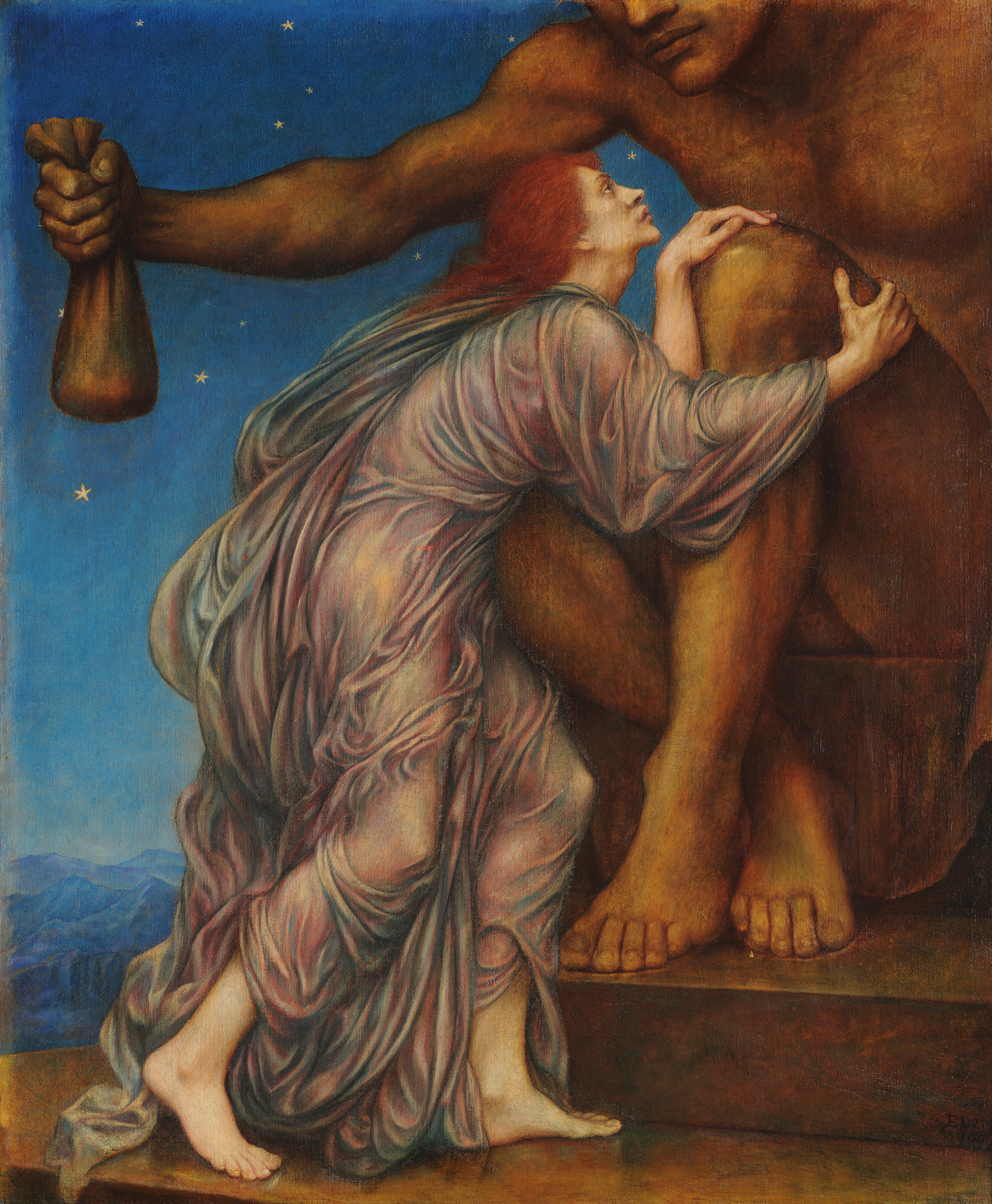
Painting The Worship of Mammon, 1909

The Gilded Cage, 1901-1902 or 1908

Dryad, 1884-1885

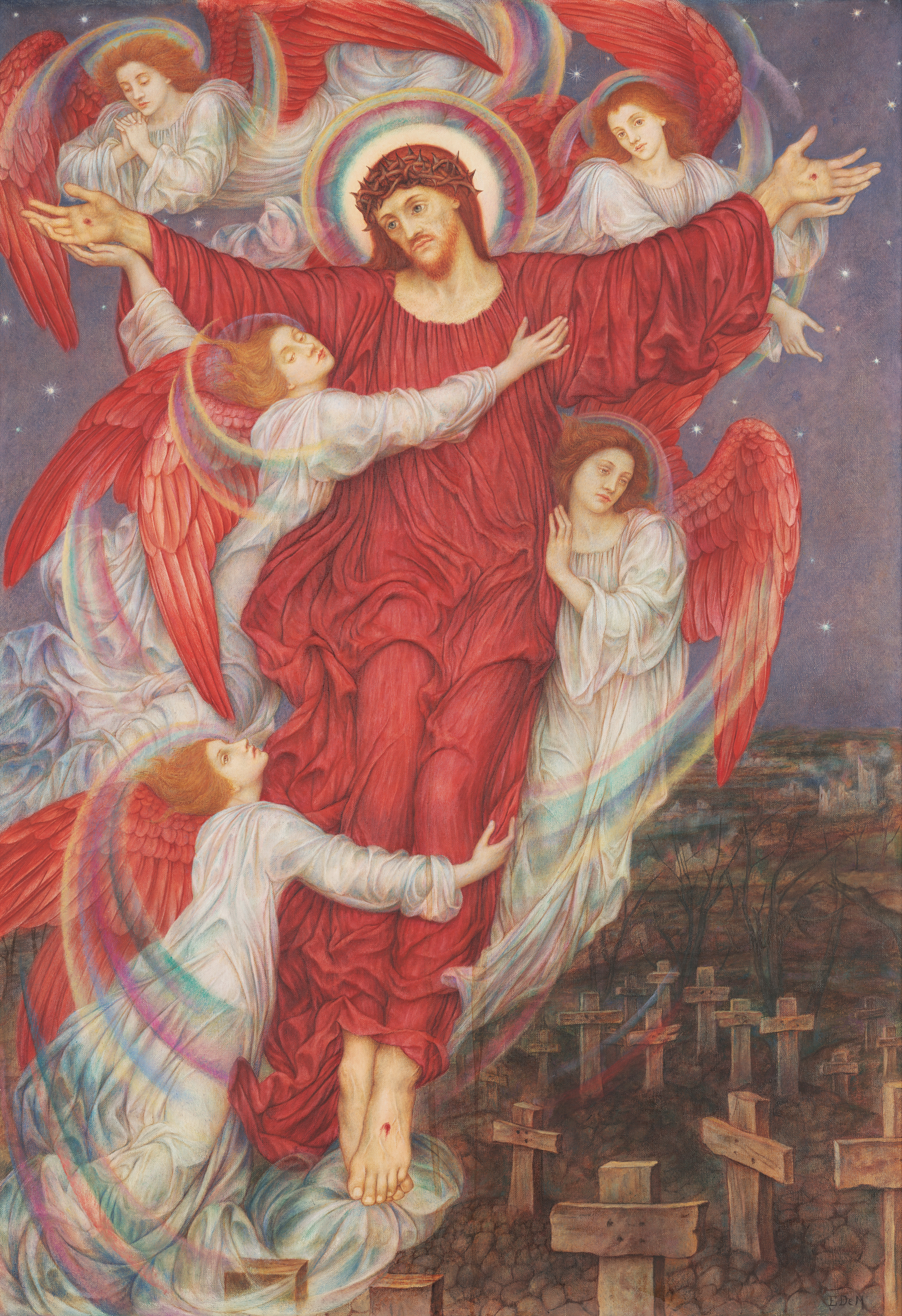
The Red Cross, 1918
