= Aurora Triumphans =

Painting by Evelyn De Morgan

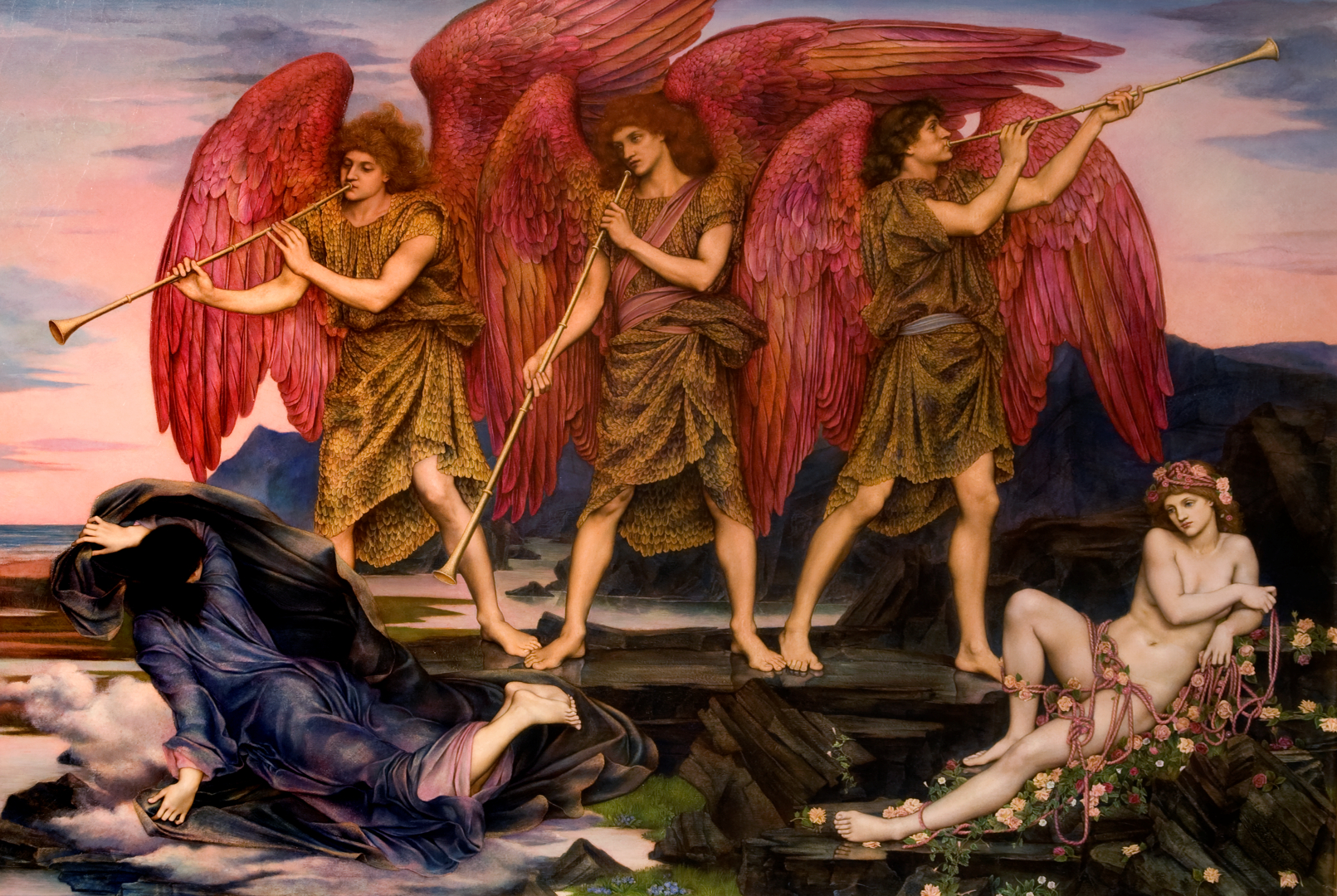
- Artist: Evelyn De Morgan
- Year: 1877–78 or c. 1886
- Medium: Oil on canvas
- Dimensions: 120 cm × 170 cm (46 in × 68 in)
- Location: Russell-Cotes Art Gallery & Museum, Bournemouth

Aurora Triumphans (Latin: Triumphant Aurora) is an oil-on-canvas painting by the English artist Evelyn De Morgan, featuring the Roman goddess of dawn Aurora, that breaks the shackles of night. Aurora lies naked in the lower right corner, covered with carefully draped ropes of pink roses. Taking up two-thirds of the painting, there are three red-winged angels with trumpets and gold tunics. Set in opposition to Aurora, in the lower left corner is a dark-robed Night, who swirls away a black cloak. In 1886 the painting was exhibited at the Grosvenor Gallery in London.

The flowers strewn around Aurora and the pale glow of her naked body are set in opposition to the shadowy drapery of Night. Aurora's frontal, open pose reverses the anonymity of Night, who is turned away from the viewer. The painting currently belongs to the Russell-Cotes Museum in Bournemouth. Merton Russell-Cotes' son Herbert bought it for the museum in around 1922 thinking that it was a Burne-Jones original after an unscrupulous art dealer had painted over the signature with Burne-Jones' initials to get a higher price.

According to art historian Elise Lawton Smith, Aurora's "lethargic pose ... may signify her transitional state between night/matter and light/spirit. She will move beyond torpor toward a new energy, as heralded by the three angels blowing their trumpets. Thus her power (or triumph, as suggested by the title) derives not from her mythological status, but from her role as a spiritualist metaphor."
