= Cadmus and Harmonia (painting) =

Painting by Evelyn De Morgan

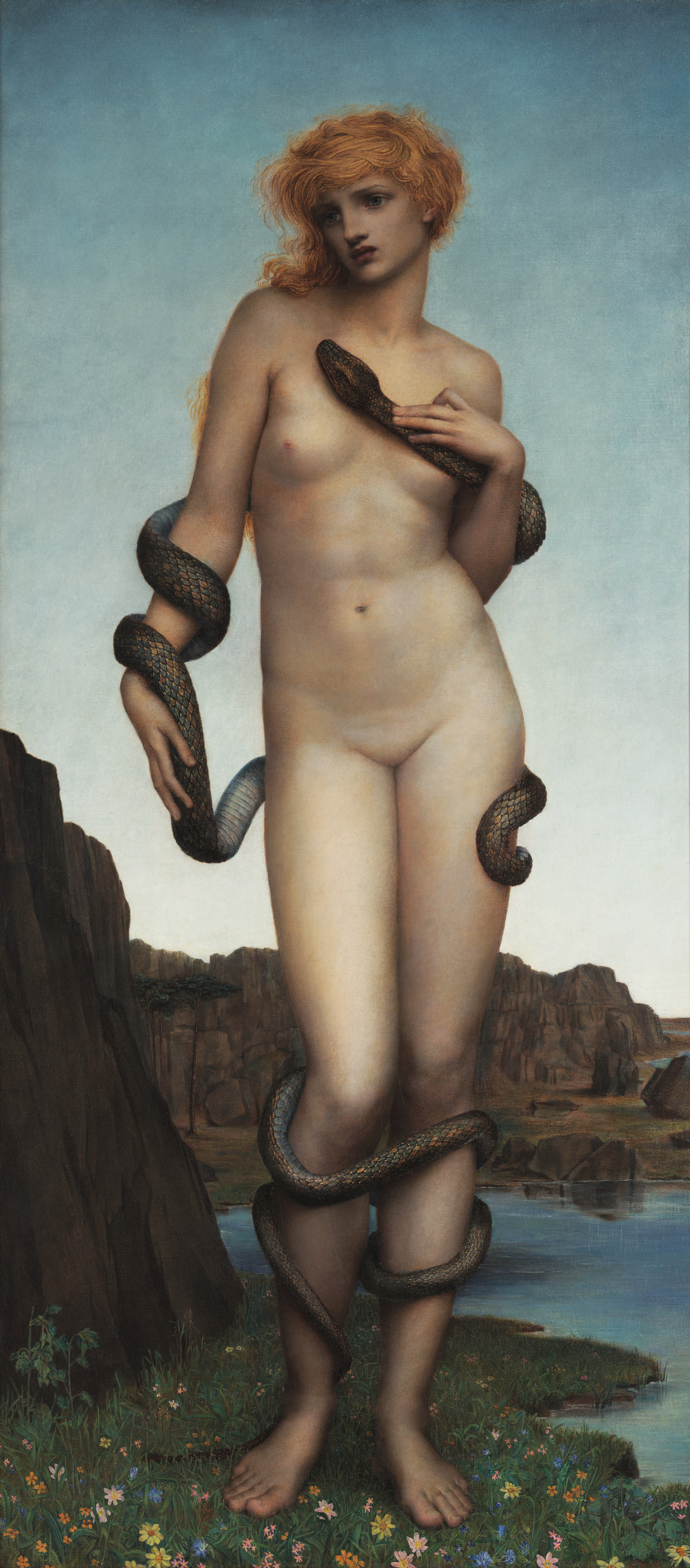
- Artist: Evelyn De Morgan
- Year: 1877
- Type: Oil on canvas, history painting
- Dimensions: 148.5 cm × 89.5 cm (58.5 in × 35.2 in)
- Location: Wightwick Manor; Wolverhampton

Cadmus and Harmonia is an oil painting by the English artist Evelyn De Morgan, from 1877.

== History and description ==
Combining nude art and history painting, it is inspired by Ovid's Metamorphoses, in the episode in which Cadmus is transformed into a serpent. He is shown embracing his naked wife Harmonia. De Morgan had recently visited Italy and Harmonia's stance resembles that of Botticelli's The Birth of Venus. She makes a significant change in portraying Harmonia as a much younger woman than as described by Ovid.

It was the first of De Morgan's paintings to be exhibited at the Dudley Gallery in London. It was purchased by the Liberal politician Sir Charles Dilke.

== Bibliography ==
- Frederick, Margaretta F. Evelyn & William De Morgan: A Marriage of Arts & Crafts. Yale University Press, 2022.
- Smith, Elsie Lawton. Evelyn Pickering De Morgan and the Allegorical Body. Fairleigh Dickinson University Press, 2002.
