= De Morgan Centre =

Gallery in London, England

Coordinates: 51.2213°N 0.6293°W

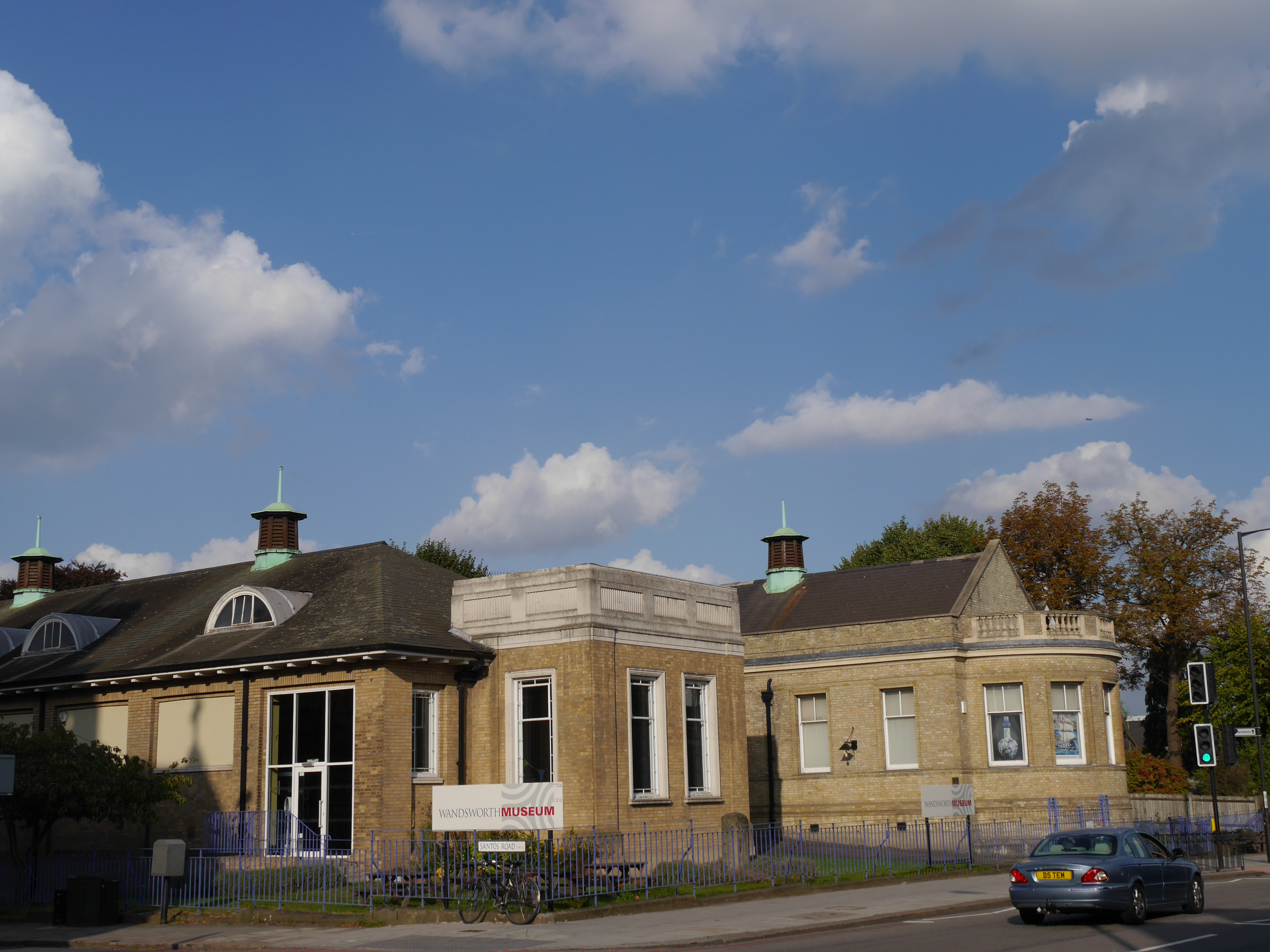
Now closed, Wandsworth Museum was previously home to the De Morgan Foundation.

The De Morgan Centre for the Study of 19th Century Art and Society was a gallery in the London Borough of Wandsworth, England, which was home for a few years to the De Morgan Collection.

From 2002 the De Morgan Centre provided public access to the De Morgan Collection in a dedicated gallery named the De Morgan Centre, which was based in the former West Hill Reference Library in Wandsworth, South West London. The West Hill Library closed on 28 September 2007 and latterly, the De Morgan Foundation shared the building with Wandsworth Museum. Both the De Morgan Centre and Wandsworth Museum closed to the public on 28 June 2014 due to the discontinuation of their lease by the building's freeholder Wandsworth Council.

Since the closure of the De Morgan Centre, the De Morgan Foundation continues to display the collection to the public in its new museum at Cannon Hall. The Cannon Hall museum is an Accredited Museum, with the accreditation being administered by Arts Council England.

They also curate long-term exhibitions at Watts Gallery - Artists' Village, and Wightwick Manor.
