= De Morgan Foundation =

UK charity holding the De Morgan collection

The De Morgan Foundation
- Formation: 1970
- Legal status: Registered charity
- Headquarters: De Morgan Museum
- Website: www.demorgan.org.uk

The De Morgan Foundation is a charity registered with The Charity Commission For England And Wales, Registered Charity No. 310004 since 1970.

The charitable objects of the Foundation are to safeguard, maintain and make available to the public the De Morgan Collection of paintings, ceramics, and other works of art made by Evelyn De Morgan and by William De Morgan and his associates, and other works of art in the collection, and to promote the appreciation of art and education in art and allied subjects.

== Governance ==
The sole Trustee of the charity The De Morgan Foundation is The De Morgan Trustee Company Limited, Company Number: 06914254. The Foundation is managed by the Board of Directors of the Trustee Company.

The De Morgan Collection is owned by the De Morgan Foundation which enables public access to the works through a programme of loans and exhibitions as well as providing an online catalogue of works.

== William and Evelyn De Morgan ==
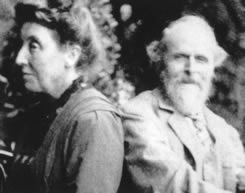
Evelyn and William De Morgan

The collection comprises work by the late 19th century ceramicist William De Morgan and his wife Evelyn De Morgan. They were both highly regarded in their fields and William De Morgan was a potter of the Arts & Crafts Movement, credited with the rediscovery of the art of lustre. His work was influenced by the Islamic tiles he saw at the South Kensington Museum.

William and Evelyn De Morgan believed their art could create a better, more beautiful world for everyone, forever.

William (1839 - 1917) reacted to the industrial revolution of mass production, with hand-painted stained glass and ceramics. The son of a mathematician father and social reform campaigner mother, William was raised in a liberal household which instilled socialist ideals in him from a young age. Following his initial instruction in drawing at Cary's Art Academy, he was prepared to enter the Royal Academy. For four years he drew rigorous studies of antique casts, growing gradually disillusioned with the institution.

William Morris offered a solution, and William embarked instead upon a career as a designer of stained glass and later, ceramics. He escaped urban London with designs of medieval flowers, and Islamic foliage and rejected gritty realism in favour of creating fantastical beasts, emblazoning his tiles with unicorns, sea monsters, fauns and mermaids. William De Morgan's socialist values were deep-rooted in practice. As an employer, he paid his workers for time off sick, around 80 years before this was a legal requirement. He ensured each of his staff were able to adopt a medieval, holistic approach to their work, rejecting modern industrial methods of manufacture and ensuring they had a meaningful working life.

Dressed as a tube of ‘rose madder’ paint at a fancy-dress party, Evelyn Pickering laughed as William De Morgan quipped that he was ‘madder still’. Three years later, the two were married.

Evelyn (1855 - 1919) rejected the stuffy echelons of the upper-class society she was born into to become an artist. With the help of her Pre-Raphaelite uncle, John Roddam Spencer Stanhope, she trained at the Slade School of Art and travelled through Italy and France sketching from the Old Masters, Botticelli and Mantegna.

Her art was immediately a commercial success, allowing her to present her feminist ideals through beautiful paintings.

Evelyn signed the Declaration in Favour of Women's Suffrage in 1889, and William became the president of the Men's League for Women's Suffrage in 1914, as they wished everyone to have the equal opportunity they had in marriage. Evelyn had propped up the failing ceramics business with around £4,000 of her personal wealth, but had been permitted to pursue her own career rather than become a ‘angel of the home’ turning gender roles of the time upside down.

Together, in 1909, they anonymously published The Result of an Experiment, a collection of the conversations they recorded with spirits of the departed in their automatic writing sessions. Many of these interactions illuminate her later, spiritualist paintings. Evelyn De Morgan's jewel-like paintings have the power to transport us to a dream-like world beyond our own. Although they subscribed to the aesthetic status quo, she painted with her own feminist, Spiritualist, and pacifist visual lexicon to ensure that her own political views were upheld in her painted propaganda.

William's career had peaked with his work in achieving the perfect metallic lustre glaze, an ancient technique he had reinvented to high acclaim. By 1904, his business had folded as his outdated designs became unpopular.

To help him deal with his depression, Evelyn recommended he tried to write instead. It worked, and he became an international literary sensation. He earned more than Evelyn for the first time, enabling her to focus on her spiritual paintings rather than any commercial considerations.

Evelyn's last work of art was her design for their headstone.

== History ==
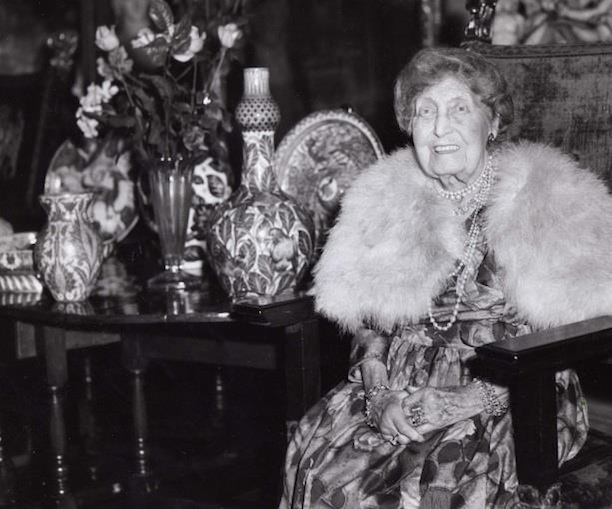
Mrs Stirling

The collection was formed by Evelyn De Morgan's sister, Mrs. Wilhelmina Stirling, a supporter of the ideals of the Pre-Raphaelite Brotherhood, who also wrote several books under the name A.M.W. Stirling. She published books on Coke of Norfolk and the Spencer Stanhopes, her family's pedigree, and on her more bohemian relatives John Roddam Spencer Stanhope and William and Evelyn De Morgan.

One of her earliest De Morgan acquisitions was probably her wedding gift from William De Morgan, a plate with a leopard politely tapping an antelope on the back, typical of his anthropomorphic designs and charming sense of humour. She soon began to collect in earnest.

Following her sister's death in 1919, she had to battle with their brother Spencer, the executor of the De Morgan estate, to buy paintings from Evelyn's studio which he saw as ‘refuse’, not good enough. Mercifully, she succeeded in acquiring these paintings and protecting them from disposal. Her relentless collecting forced her and her husband to relocate in 1931 to Old Battersea House, a Georgian mansion in South West London. Here, she lived amongst the artwork until her death in 1965, working tirelessly to establish a charitable trust to care for the artworks in perpetuity.

Upon her death in 1965, she donated her art collection to the Trust. In the years following her death, parts of the collection were displayed at a number of locations including Cardiff Castle, Cragside in Northumberland and Knightshayes Court in Devon, all of which have interiors from the years when the De Morgans were active. From 2002 until 28 June 2014, it was housed at the De Morgan Centre in the Victorian era Longstaff Reading Room of the former Wandsworth Library at West Hill in Wandsworth, in south west London, which dates from 1887.

The De Morgan Collection is now displayed at the De Morgan Museum at Cannon Hall, Watts Gallery - Artists' Village, and Wightwick Manor in Wolverhampton.

== The De Morgan Collection ==
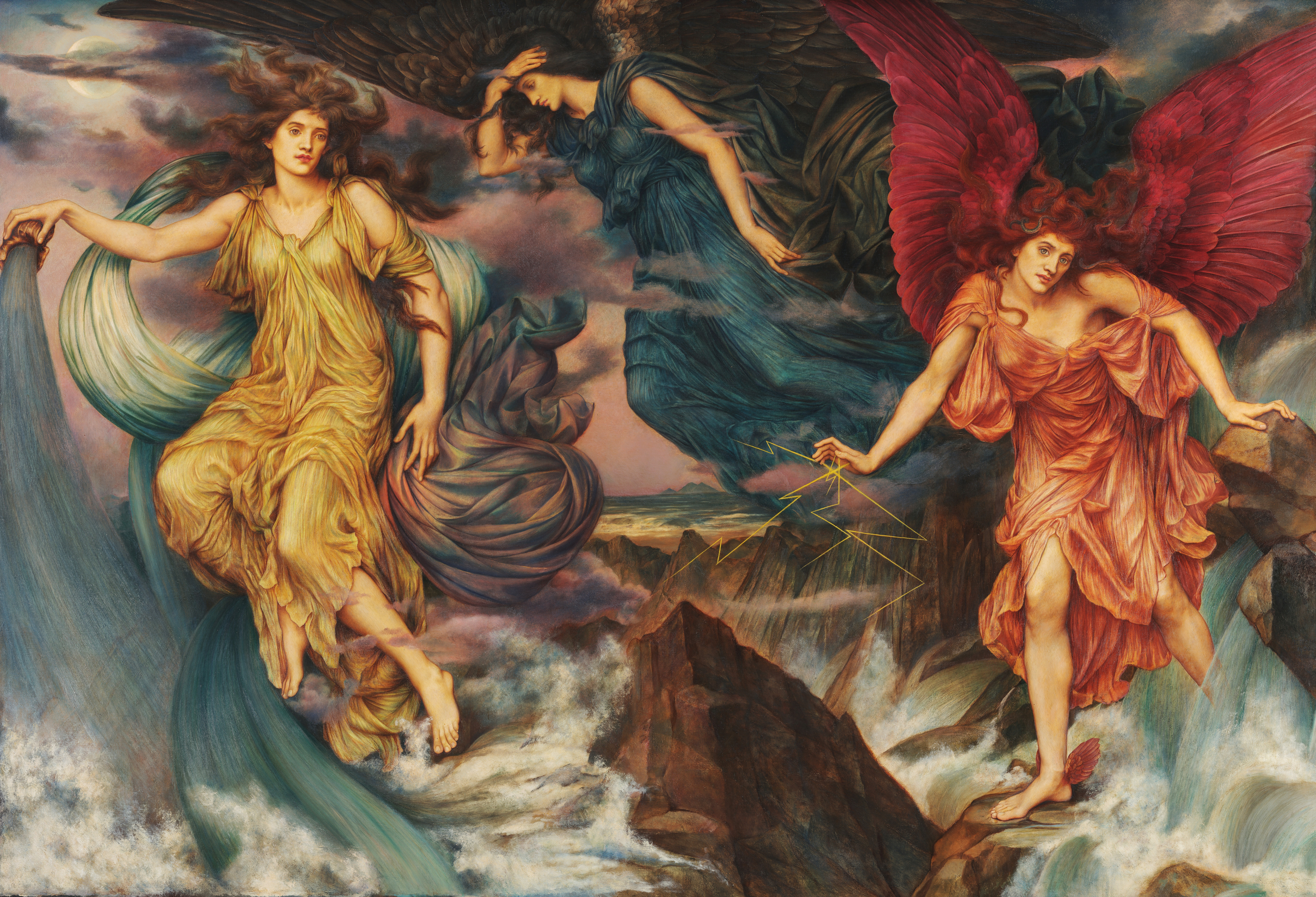
Evelyn De Morgan, The Storm Spirits, the De Morgan Collection

The De Morgan collection comprises 58 oil paintings by Evelyn De Morgan, ranging in style from classicism, Pre-Raphaelite and Symbolism.

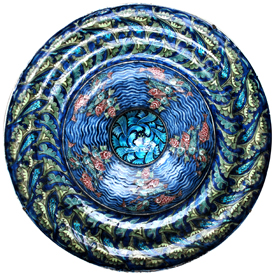
William De Morgan, Fish and Petal Rice Dish, decorated by Charles Passenger, the De Morgan Collection

The collection also comprises over 700 ceramics by William De Morgan, including 50 tile panels and 420 individual tiles, and 260 plates, chargers, vases, bottles, and bowls, etc.

Both William (1839–1917) and Evelyn (1855–1919) De Morgan were artists when they married in 1887, and in addition to their art they became involved in many of the leading issues of the day including the suffrage movement, prison reform, pacifism, and spiritualism.

The Collection is displayed in partnership with three museums where there is local and historical significance for this nationally important collection. The De Morgan Museum at Cannon Hall, Barnsley, was the family home of Evelyn and Wilhelmina's mother's family and today is the home of the exhibition 'A Family of Artists' exploring this talented family and their lives in Barnsley and beyond.

Watts Gallery - Artists’ Village, Surrey, was visited by the De Morgans when it was the home of their contemporaries Mary and George Watts. 'Decoration or Devotion?' is an exhibition that juxtaposes William and Mary's exclusive interest in the decorative elements of Islamic art for their unique designs, with Evelyn and George's deep concern for symbolic motifs that would convey their political messages.

Wightwick Manor, Wolverhampton, is a house built to Oscar Wilde's principles of the aesthetic interior and filled with De Morgan tiles and artworks. The old Malthouse is now a purpose-built De Morgan gallery, hosting the exhibition 'Look Beneath the Lustre' which encourages visitors to understand how and why the De Morgans created their artworks. Designs, drawings, and sketches are on display to allow a more meaningful engagement with original artworks.

The Foundation also makes long-term loans of the artworks to UK museums and galleries, and has a successful programme of touring exhibitions and international loans.

== See also ==
- List of single-artist museums

== De Morgan works ==
- Postman's Park
- Memorial to Heroic Self Sacrifice - Postman's Park
- Leighton House Museum
- Cannon Hall
- Ashmolean Museum
- Watts Gallery
