= John Ruskin =

English polymath (1819–1900)

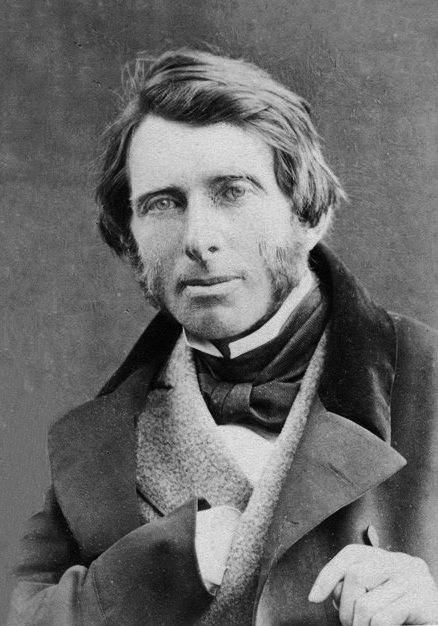
- Ruskin in 1863
- Born: 8 February 1819; London, England
- Died: 20 January 1900 (aged 80); Coniston, Lancashire, England
- Spouse: Effie Gray (m. 1848; ann. 1854)
- Parent(s): John James Ruskin, Margaret Cock

Education
- Education: Christ Church, Oxford; King's College London

Philosophical work
- Era: 19th-century philosophy
- Region: Western philosophy
- School: Continental philosophy
- Main interests: Aesthetics; ethics; education; political economy
- Notable works: Modern Painters 5 vols. (1843–1860); The Seven Lamps of Architecture (1849); The Stones of Venice 3 vols. (1851–1853); Unto This Last (1860, 1862); Fors Clavigera (1871–1884); Praeterita 3 vols. (1885–1889)
- Notable ideas: Pathetic fallacy; illth

John Ruskin (8 February 1819 – 20 January 1900) was an English polymath – a writer, lecturer, art historian, art critic, draughtsman and philanthropist of the Victorian era. He wrote on subjects as varied as art, architecture, political economy, education, museology, geology, botany, ornithology, literature, history, and myth.

Ruskin's writing styles and literary forms were equally varied. He wrote essays and treatises, poetry and lectures, travel guides and manuals, letters and even a fairy tale, The King of the Golden River. He also made detailed sketches and paintings of rocks, plants, birds, landscapes, architectural structures and ornamentation. The elaborate style that characterised his earliest writing on art gave way in time to plainer language designed to communicate his ideas more effectively. In all of his writing, he emphasised the connections between nature, art and society.

Ruskin was hugely influential in the latter half of the 19th century and up to the First World War. After a period of relative decline, his reputation has steadily improved since the 1960s with the publication of numerous academic studies of his work. Today, his ideas and concerns are widely recognised as having anticipated interest in environmentalism, sustainability, ethical consumerism, and craft.

Ruskin first came to widespread attention with the first volume of Modern Painters (1843), an extended essay in defence of the work of J. M. W. Turner in which he argued that the principal duty of the artist is "truth to nature". This meant rooting art in experience and close observation. From the 1850s, he championed the Pre-Raphaelites, who were influenced by his ideas. His work increasingly focused on social and political issues. Unto This Last (1860, 1862) marked the shift in emphasis. In 1869, Ruskin became the first Slade Professor of Fine Art at the University of Oxford, where he established the Ruskin School of Drawing. In 1871, he began his monthly "letters to the workmen and labourers of Great Britain", published under the title Fors Clavigera (1871–1884). In the course of this complex and deeply personal work, he developed the principles underlying his ideal society. Its practical outcome was the founding of the Guild of St George, an organisation that endures today.

== Early life (1819–1846) ==
=== Genealogy ===
Ruskin was the only child of first cousins. His father, John James Ruskin (1785–1864), was a sherry and wine importer, founding partner and de facto business manager of Ruskin, Telford and Domecq (see Allied Domecq). John James was born and brought up in Edinburgh, Scotland, to a mother from Glenluce and a father originally from Hertfordshire. His wife, Ruskin's mother, Margaret Cock (1781–1871), was the daughter of a publican in Croydon. She had joined the Ruskin household when she became companion to John James's mother, Catherine.

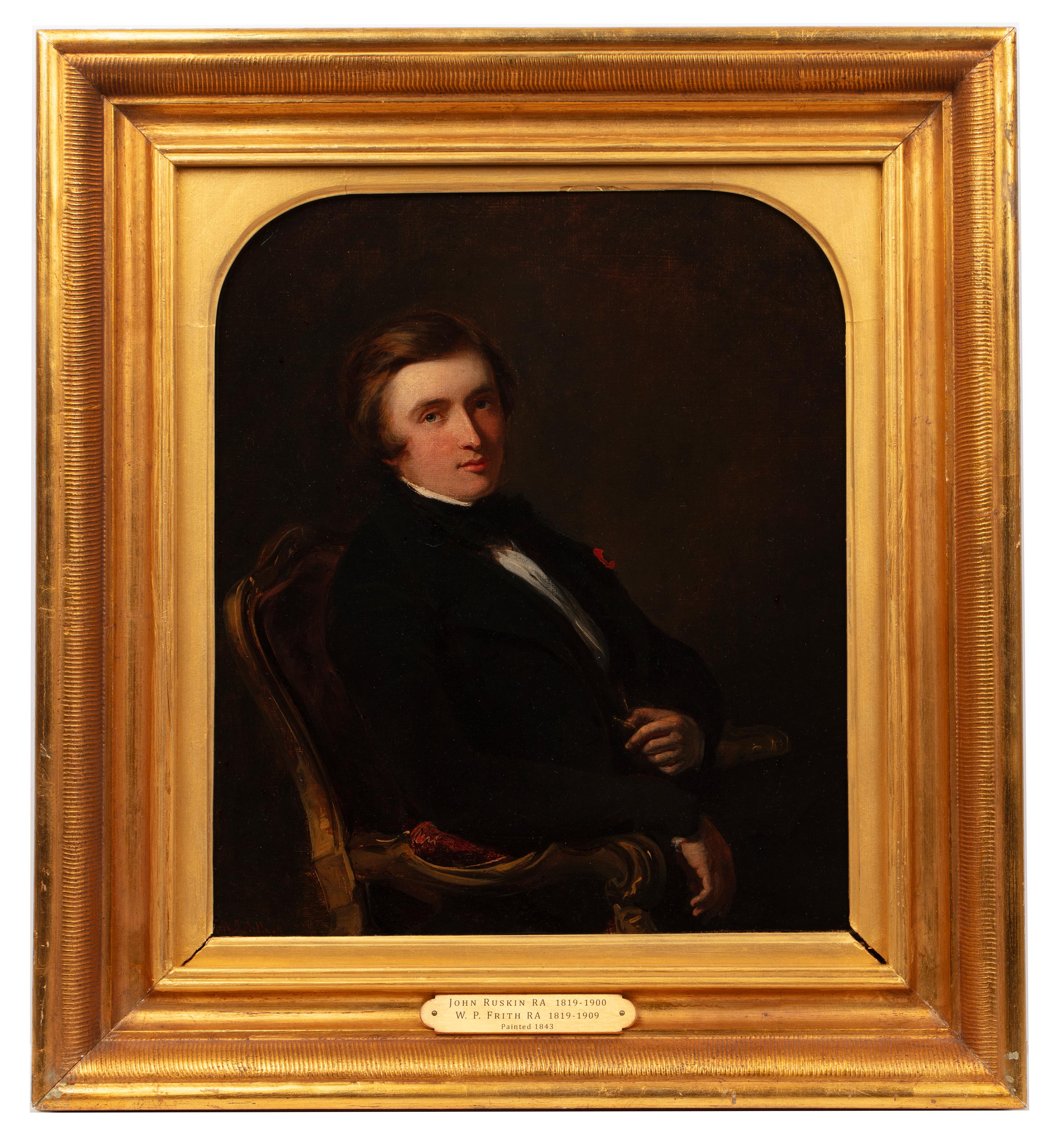
1843 portrait of John Ruskin by William Powell Frith, from the collection of Andrew Rhys Young, New York

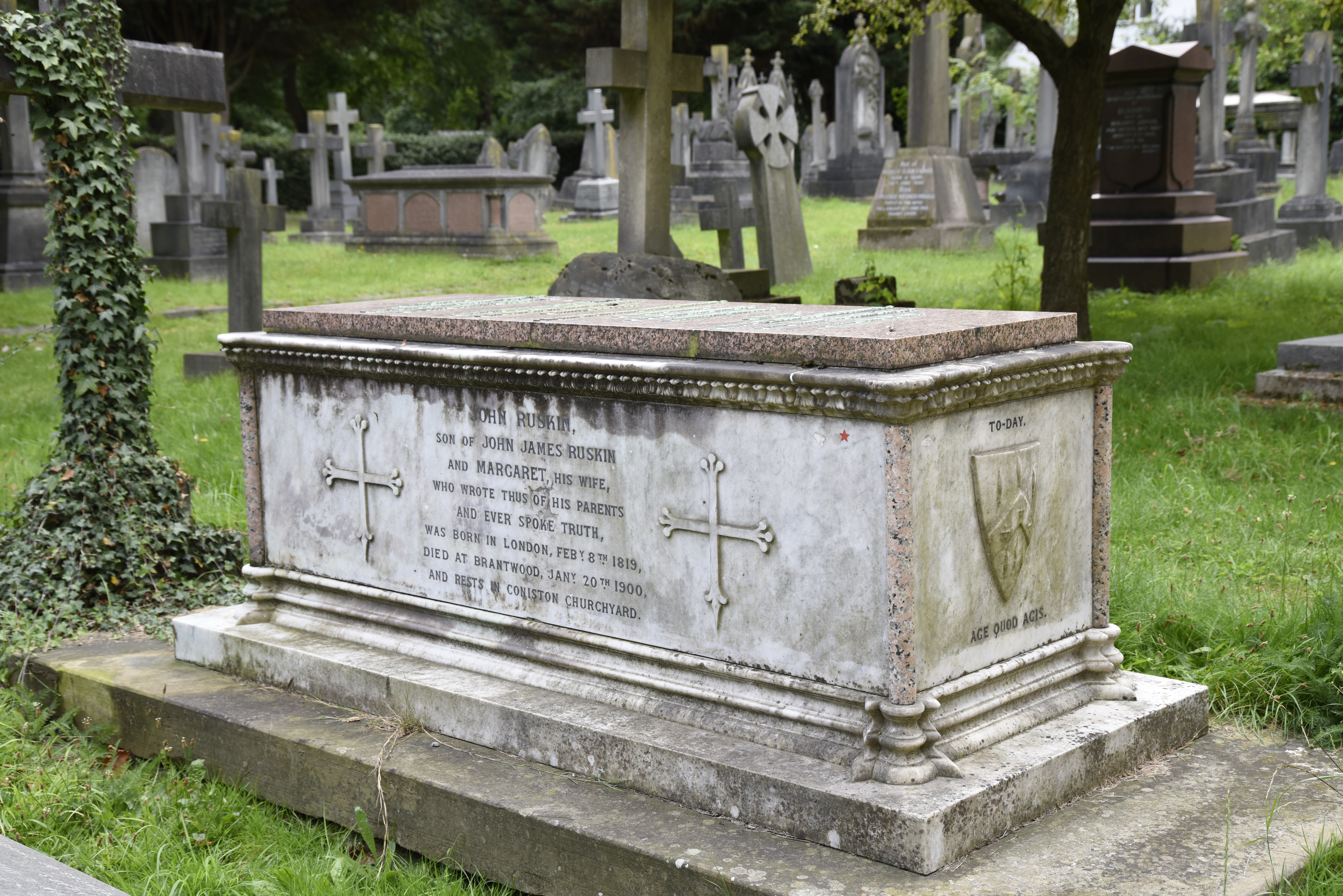
The grave of John James Ruskin, father of John Ruskin, in the churchyard of St John the Evangelist, Shirley, Croydon

John James had hoped to practise law, and was articled as a clerk in London. His father, John Thomas Ruskin, described as a grocer (but apparently an ambitious wholesale merchant), was an incompetent businessman. To save the family from bankruptcy, John James, whose prudence and success were in stark contrast to his father, took on all debts, settling the last of them in 1832. John James and Margaret were engaged in 1809, but opposition to the union from John Thomas, and the problem of his debts, delayed the couple's wedding. They finally married, without celebration, in 1818. John James died on 3 March 1864 and is buried in the churchyard of St John the Evangelist, Shirley, Croydon.

=== Childhood and education ===
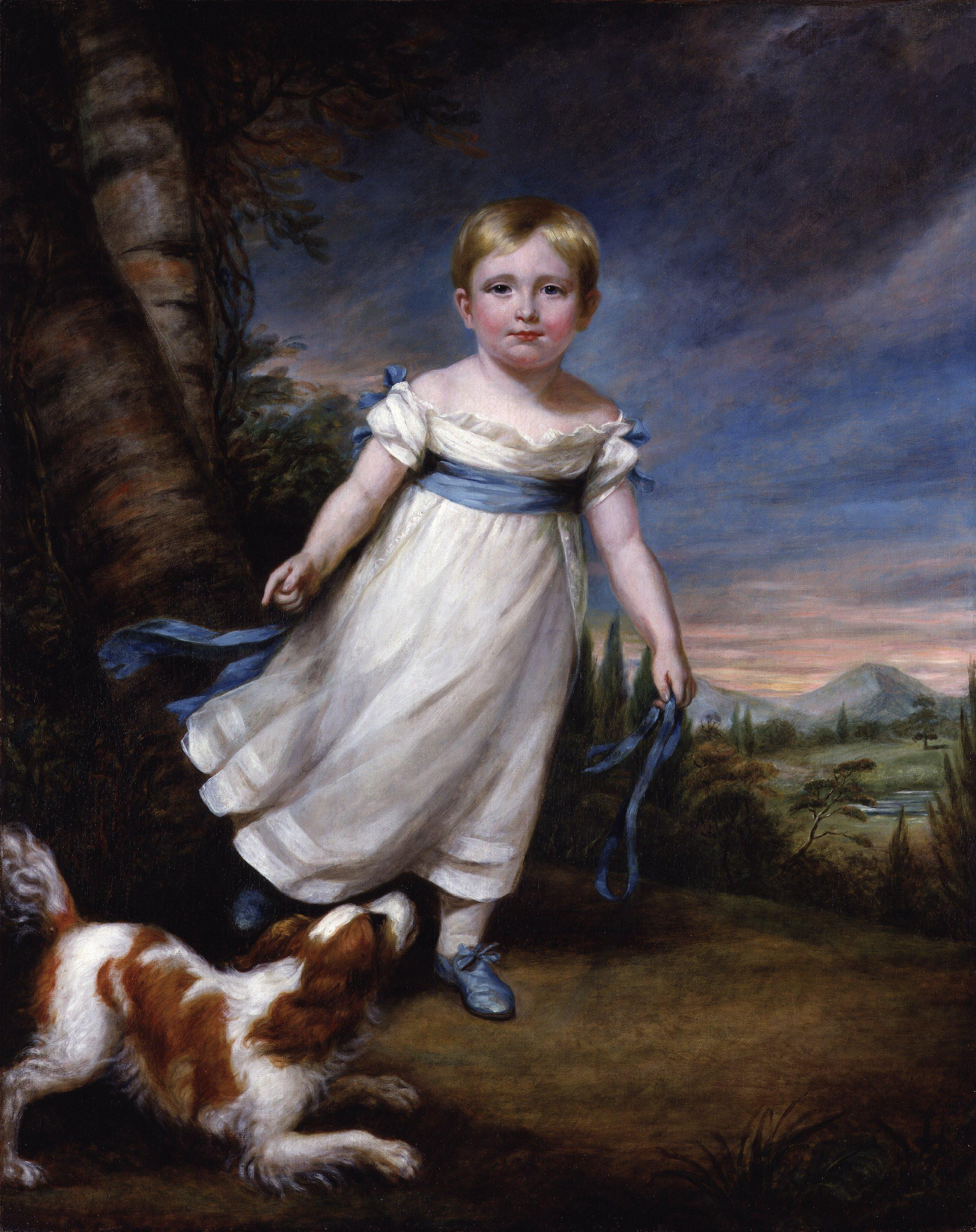
Portrait of John Ruskin by James Northcote, 1822

Ruskin was born on 8 February 1819 at 54 Hunter Street, Brunswick Square, London (demolished 1969), south of what is now St Pancras railway station. His childhood was shaped by the contrasting influences of his father and mother, both of whom were fiercely ambitious for him. John James Ruskin helped to develop his son's Romanticism. They shared a passion for the works of Byron, Shakespeare and especially Walter Scott. They visited Scott's home, Abbotsford, in 1838, but Ruskin was disappointed by its appearance. Margaret Ruskin, an evangelical Christian, more cautious and restrained than her husband, taught young John to read the Bible from beginning to end, and then to start all over again, committing large portions to memory. Its language, imagery and parables had a profound and lasting effect on his writing. He later wrote:

She read alternate verses with me, watching at first, every intonation of my voice, and correcting the false ones, till she made me understand the verse, if within my reach, rightly and energetically.

— Praeterita, XXXV, 40

Ruskin's childhood was spent from 1823 at 28 Herne Hill (demolished c. 1912), near the village of Camberwell in South London. He had few friends of his own age, but it was not the friendless and joyless experience he later said it was in his autobiography, Praeterita (1885–89). He was educated at home by his parents and private tutors, including Congregationalist preacher Edward Andrews, whose daughters, Mrs Eliza Orme and Emily Augusta Patmore were later credited with introducing Ruskin to the Pre-Raphaelite Brotherhood.

From 1834 to 1835 he attended the school in Peckham run by the progressive evangelical Thomas Dale (1797–1870). Ruskin heard Dale lecture in 1836 at King's College, London, where Dale was the first Professor of English Literature. Ruskin went on to enrol and complete his studies at King's College, where he prepared for Oxford under Dale's tutelage.

=== Travel ===
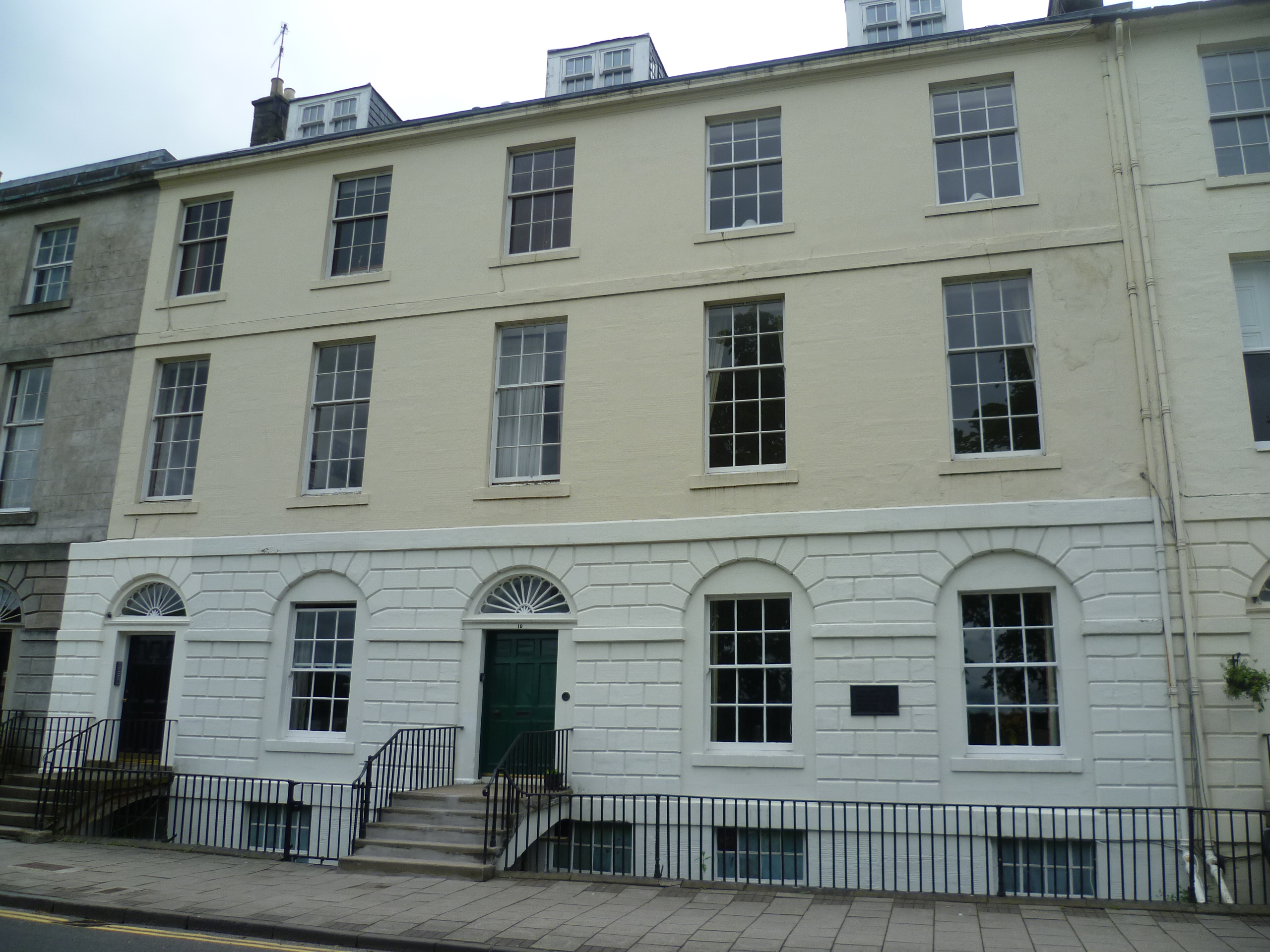
10 Rose Terrace, Perth (on the right), where Ruskin spent boyhood holidays with Scottish relatives

Ruskin was greatly influenced by the extensive and privileged travels he enjoyed in his childhood. It helped to establish his taste and augmented his education. He sometimes accompanied his father on visits to business clients at their country houses, which exposed him to English landscapes, architecture and paintings. Family tours took them to the Lake District (his first long poem, Iteriad, was an account of his tour in 1830) and to relatives in Perth, Scotland. As early as 1825, the family visited France and Belgium. Their continental tours became increasingly ambitious in scope: in 1833 they visited Strasbourg, Schaffhausen, Milan, Genoa and Turin, places to which Ruskin frequently returned. He developed a lifelong love of the Alps, and in 1835 visited Venice for the first time, that 'Paradise of cities' that provided the subject and symbolism of much of his later work.

These tours gave Ruskin the opportunity to observe and record his impressions of nature. He composed elegant, though mainly conventional poetry, some of which was published in Friendship's Offering. His early notebooks and sketchbooks are full of visually sophisticated and technically accomplished drawings of maps, landscapes and buildings, remarkable for a boy of his age. He was profoundly affected by Samuel Rogers's poem Italy (1830), a copy of which was given to him as a 13th birthday present; in particular, he deeply admired the accompanying illustrations by J. M. W. Turner. Much of Ruskin's own art in the 1830s was in imitation of Turner, and of Samuel Prout, whose Sketches Made in Flanders and Germany (1833) he also admired. His artistic skills were refined under the tutelage of Charles Runciman, Copley Fielding and J. D. Harding.

=== First publications ===
Ruskin's journeys also provided inspiration for writing. His first publication was the poem "On Skiddaw and Derwent Water" (originally entitled "Lines written at the Lakes in Cumberland: Derwentwater" and published in the Spiritual Times) (August 1829). In 1834, three short articles for Loudon's Magazine of Natural History were published. They show early signs of his skill as a close "scientific" observer of nature, especially its geology.

From September 1837 to December 1838, Ruskin's The Poetry of Architecture was serialised in Loudon's Architectural Magazine, under the pen name "Kata Phusin" (Greek for "According to Nature"). It was a study of cottages, villas, and other dwellings centred on a Wordsworthian argument that buildings should be sympathetic to their immediate environment and use local materials. It anticipated key themes in his later writings. In 1839, Ruskin's "Remarks on the Present State of Meteorological Science" was published in Transactions of the Meteorological Society.

=== Oxford ===
In Michaelmas 1836, Ruskin matriculated at the University of Oxford, taking up residence at Christ Church in January of the following year. Enrolled as a gentleman-commoner, he enjoyed equal status with his aristocratic peers. Ruskin was generally uninspired by Oxford and suffered bouts of illness. Perhaps the greatest advantage of his time there was in the few, close friendships he made. His tutor, the Rev Walter Lucas Brown, always encouraged him, as did a young senior tutor, Henry Liddell (later the father of Alice Liddell) and a private tutor, the Reverend Osborne Gordon. He became close to the geologist and natural theologian William Buckland. Among his fellow undergraduates, Ruskin's most important friends were Charles Thomas Newton and Henry Acland.

His most noteworthy success came in 1839 when, at the third attempt, he won the prestigious Newdigate Prize for poetry (Arthur Hugh Clough came second). He met William Wordsworth, who was receiving an honorary degree, at the ceremony.

Ruskin's health was poor and he never became independent from his family during his time at Oxford. His mother took lodgings on High Street, where his father joined them at weekends. He was devastated to hear that his first love, Adèle Domecq, the second daughter of his father's business partner, had become engaged to a French nobleman. In April 1840, whilst revising for his examinations, he began to cough blood, which led to fears of consumption and a long break from Oxford travelling with his parents.

Before he returned to Oxford, Ruskin responded to a challenge that had been put to him by Effie Gray, whom he later married: the twelve-year-old Effie had asked him to write a fairy story. During a six-week break at Leamington Spa to undergo Dr Jephson's (1798–1878) celebrated salt-water cure, Ruskin wrote his only work of fiction, the fable The King of the Golden River (not published until December 1850 (but imprinted 1851), with illustrations by Richard Doyle). A work of Christian sacrificial morality and charity, it is set in the Alpine landscape Ruskin loved and knew so well. It remains the most translated of all his works. Back at Oxford, in 1842 Ruskin sat for a pass degree, and was awarded an uncommon honorary double fourth-class degree in recognition of his achievements.

=== Modern Painters I (1843) ===
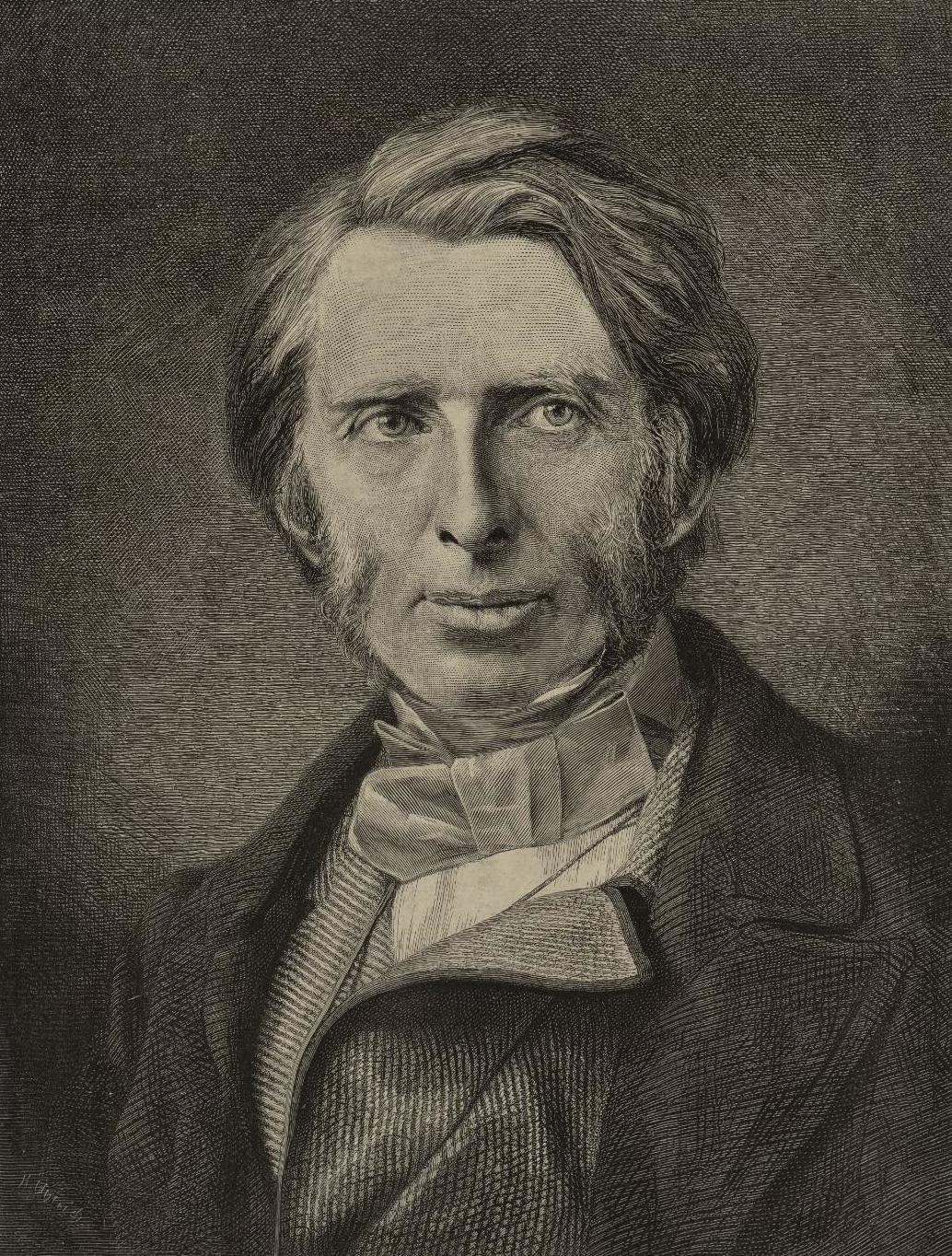
Engraving of Ruskin by Henry Sigismund Uhlrich, c. 1860

For much of the period from late 1840 to autumn 1842, Ruskin was abroad with his parents, mainly in Italy. His studies of Italian art were chiefly guided by George Richmond, to whom the Ruskins were introduced by Joseph Severn, a friend of Keats (whose son, Arthur Severn, later married Ruskin's cousin, Joan). He was galvanised into writing a defence of J. M. W. Turner when he read an attack on several of Turner's pictures exhibited at the Royal Academy. It recalled an attack by the critic Rev John Eagles in Blackwood's Magazine in 1836, which had prompted Ruskin to write a long essay. John James had sent the piece to Turner, who did not wish it to be published. It finally appeared in 1903.

Before Ruskin began Modern Painters, John James Ruskin had begun collecting watercolours, including works by Samuel Prout and Turner. Both painters were among occasional guests of the Ruskins at Herne Hill, and 163 Denmark Hill (demolished 1947) to which the family moved in 1842.

What became the first volume of Modern Painters (1843), published by Smith, Elder & Co. under the anonymous authority of "A Graduate of Oxford", was Ruskin's answer to Turner's critics. Ruskin controversially argued that modern landscape painters—and in particular Turner—were superior to the so-called "Old Masters" of the post-Renaissance period. Ruskin maintained that, unlike Turner, Old Masters such as Gaspard Dughet (Gaspar Poussin), Claude, and Salvator Rosa favoured pictorial convention, and not "truth to nature". He explained that he meant "moral as well as material truth". The job of the artist is to observe the reality of nature and not to invent it in a studio—to render imaginatively on canvas what he has seen and understood, free of any rules of composition. For Ruskin, modern landscapists demonstrated superior understanding of the "truths" of water, air, clouds, stones, and vegetation, a profound appreciation of which Ruskin demonstrated in his own prose. He described works he had seen at the National Gallery and Dulwich Picture Gallery with extraordinary verbal felicity.

Although critics were slow to react and the reviews were mixed, many notable literary and artistic figures were impressed with the young man's work, including Charlotte Brontë and Elizabeth Gaskell. Suddenly Ruskin had found his métier, and in one leap helped redefine the genre of art criticism, mixing a discourse of polemic with aesthetics, scientific observation and ethics. It cemented Ruskin's relationship with Turner. After the artist's death in 1851, Ruskin catalogued nearly 20,000 sketches that Turner gave to the British nation.

=== 1845 tour and Modern Painters II (1846) ===
Ruskin toured the continent with his parents again during 1844, visiting Chamonix and Paris, studying the geology of the Alps and the paintings of Titian, Veronese and Perugino among others at the Louvre. In 1845, at the age of 26, he undertook to travel without his parents for the first time. It provided him with an opportunity to study medieval art and architecture in France, Switzerland and especially Italy. In Lucca he saw the Tomb of Ilaria del Carretto by Jacopo della Quercia, which Ruskin considered the exemplar of Christian sculpture (he later associated it with the then object of his love, Rose La Touche). He drew inspiration from what he saw at the Campo Santo in Pisa, and in Florence. In Venice, he was particularly impressed by the works of Fra Angelico and Giotto in St Mark's Cathedral, and Tintoretto in the Scuola di San Rocco, but he was alarmed by the combined effects of decay and modernisation on the city: "Venice is lost to me", he wrote. It finally convinced him that architectural restoration was destruction, and that the only true and faithful action was preservation and conservation.

Drawing on his travels, he wrote the second volume of Modern Painters (published April 1846). The volume concentrated on Renaissance and pre-Renaissance artists rather than on Turner. It was a more theoretical work than its predecessor. Ruskin explicitly linked the aesthetic and the divine, arguing that truth, beauty and religion are inextricably bound together: "the Beautiful as a gift of God". In defining categories of beauty and imagination, Ruskin argued that all great artists must perceive beauty and, with their imagination, communicate it creatively by means of symbolic representation. Generally, critics gave this second volume a warmer reception, although many found the attack on the aesthetic orthodoxy associated with Joshua Reynolds difficult to accept. In the summer, Ruskin was abroad again with his father, who still hoped his son might become a poet, even poet laureate, just one among many factors increasing the tension between them.

== Middle life (1847–1869) ==
=== Marriage to Effie Gray ===
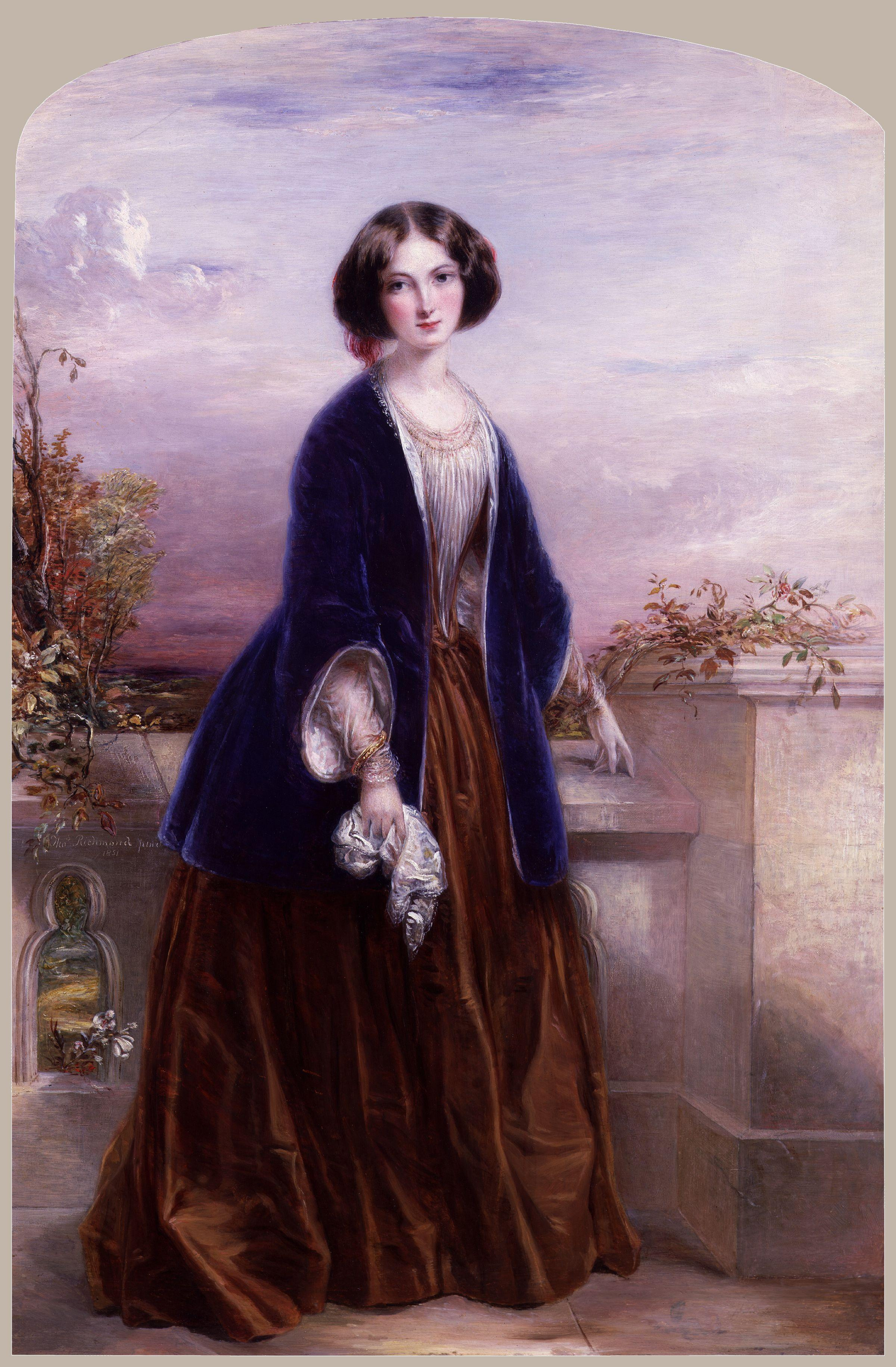
Effie Gray painted by Thomas Richmond. She thought the portrait made her look like "a graceful Doll".

During 1847, Ruskin became closer to Euphemia "Effie" Gray, the daughter of family friends. It was for her that Ruskin had written The King of the Golden River. The couple were engaged in October. They married on 10 April 1848 at her home, Bowerswell, in Perth, once the residence of the Ruskin family. It was the site of the suicide of John Thomas Ruskin (Ruskin's grandfather). Owing to this association and other complications, Ruskin's parents did not attend. The European Revolutions of 1848 meant that the newlyweds' earliest travels together were restricted, but they were able to visit Normandy, where Ruskin admired the Gothic architecture.

Their early life together was spent at 31 Park Street, Mayfair, secured for them by Ruskin's father (later addresses included nearby 6 Charles Street, and 30 Herne Hill). Effie was too unwell to undertake the European tour of 1849, so Ruskin visited the Alps with his parents, gathering material for the third and fourth volumes of Modern Painters. He was struck by the contrast between the Alpine beauty and the poverty of Alpine peasants, stirring his increasingly sensitive social conscience.

The marriage was unhappy, with Ruskin reportedly being cruel to Effie and distrustful of her. For unclear reasons the marriage was never consummated and was annulled six years later in 1854.

=== Architecture ===
Ruskin's developing interest in architecture, and particularly in the Gothic, led to the first work to bear his name, The Seven Lamps of Architecture (1849). It contained 14 plates etched by the author. The title refers to seven moral categories that Ruskin considered vital to and inseparable from all architecture: sacrifice, truth, power, beauty, life, memory, and obedience. All would provide recurring themes in his future work. Seven Lamps promoted the virtues of a secular and Protestant form of Gothic. It was a challenge to the Catholic influence of architect A. W. N. Pugin.

=== The Stones of Venice ===
In November 1849, John and Effie Ruskin visited Venice, staying at the Hotel Danieli. Their different personalities are revealed by their contrasting priorities. For Effie, Venice provided an opportunity to socialise, while Ruskin was engaged in solitary studies. In particular, he made a point of drawing the Ca' d'Oro and the Doge's Palace, or Palazzo Ducale, because he feared that they would be destroyed by the occupying Austrian troops. One of these troops, Lieutenant Charles Paulizza, became friendly with Effie, apparently with Ruskin's consent. Her brother, among others, later claimed that Ruskin was deliberately encouraging the friendship to compromise her, as an excuse to separate.

Meanwhile, Ruskin was making the extensive sketches and notes that he used for his three-volume work The Stones of Venice (1851–53). Developing from a technical history of Venetian architecture from the Byzantine to the Renaissance, into a broad cultural history, Stones represented Ruskin's opinion of contemporary England. It served as a warning about the moral and spiritual health of society. Ruskin argued that Venice had degenerated slowly. Its cultural achievements had been compromised, and its society corrupted, by the decline of true Christian faith. Instead of revering the divine, Renaissance artists honoured themselves, arrogantly celebrating human sensuousness.

The chapter, "The Nature of Gothic" appeared in the second volume of Stones. Praising Gothic ornament, Ruskin argued that it was an expression of the artisan's joy in free, creative work. The worker must be allowed to think and to express his own personality and ideas, ideally using his own hands, rather than machinery.

We want one man to be always thinking, and another to be always working, and we call one a gentleman, and the other an operative; whereas the workman ought often to be thinking, and the thinker often to be working, and both should be gentlemen, in the best sense. As it is, we make both ungentle, the one envying, the other despising, his brother; and the mass of society is made up of morbid thinkers and miserable workers. Now it is only by labour that thought can be made healthy, and only by thought that labour can be made happy, and the two cannot be separated with impunity.

— John Ruskin, The Stones of Venice vol. II: Cook and Wedderburn 10.201.

This was both an aesthetic attack on, and a social critique of, the division of labour in particular, and industrial capitalism in general. This chapter had a profound effect, and was reprinted both by the Christian socialist founders of the Working Men's College and later by the Arts and Crafts pioneer and socialist William Morris.

=== Pre-Raphaelites ===
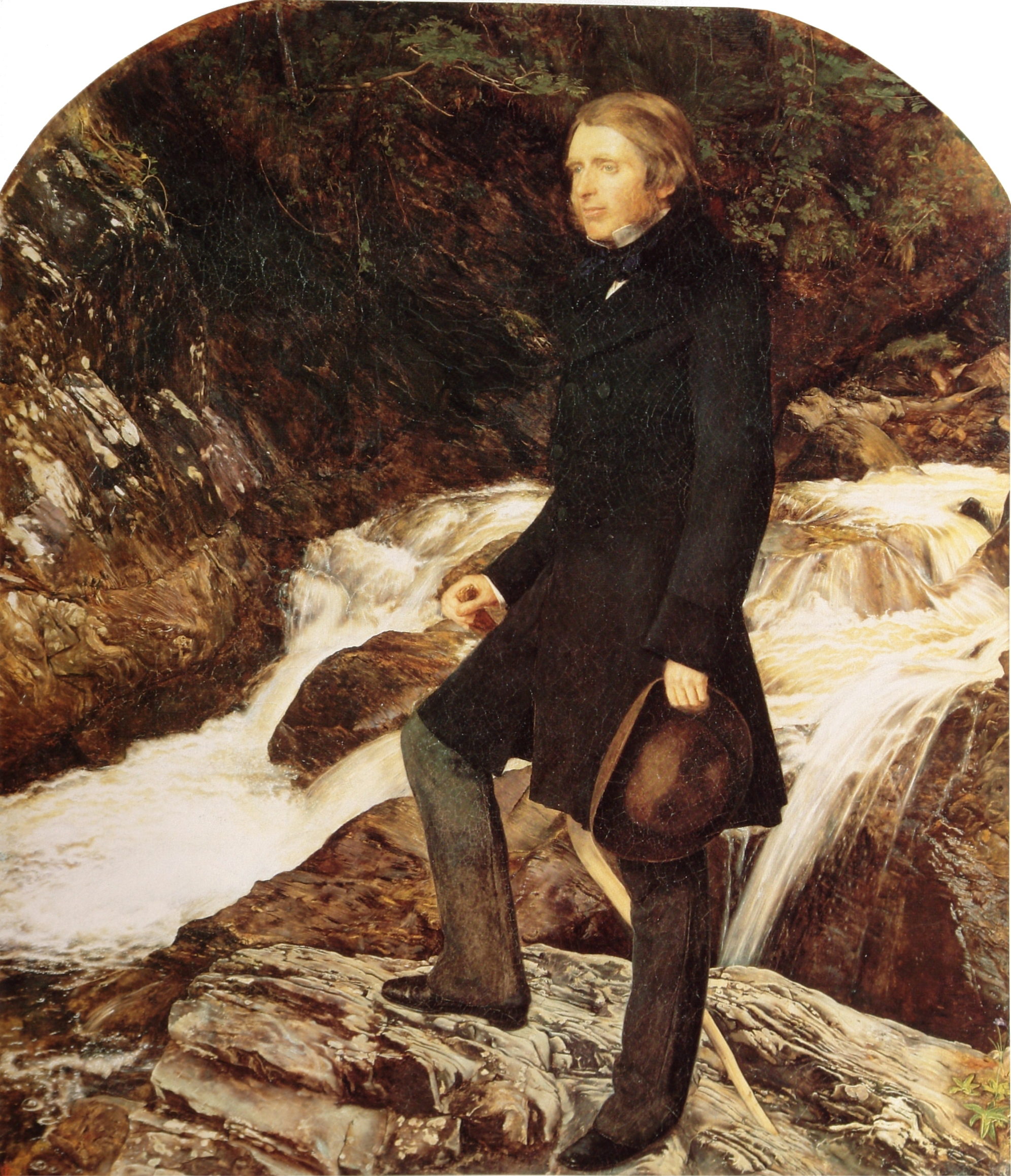
John Ruskin painted by the Pre-Raphaelite artist John Everett Millais standing at Glen Finglas, Scotland, (1853–54).

John Everett Millais, William Holman Hunt and Dante Gabriel Rossetti had established the Pre-Raphaelite Brotherhood in 1848. The Pre-Raphaelite commitment to 'naturalism' – "paint[ing] from nature only", depicting nature in fine detail, had been influenced by Ruskin.

Ruskin became acquainted with Millais after the artists made an approach to Ruskin through their mutual friend Coventry Patmore. Initially, Ruskin had not been impressed by Millais's Christ in the House of His Parents (1849–50), a painting that some considered blasphemous at the time, but Ruskin wrote letters defending the Pre-Raphaelite Brotherhood to The Times during May 1851. Providing Millais with artistic patronage and encouragement, in the summer of 1853 the artist (and his brother) travelled to Scotland with Ruskin and Effie where, at Glen Finglas, he painted the closely observed landscape background of gneiss rock to which, as had always been intended, he later added Ruskin's portrait.

Millais had painted a picture of Effie for The Order of Release, 1746, exhibited at the Royal Academy in 1852. Suffering increasingly from physical illness and acute mental anxiety, Effie was arguing fiercely with her husband and his intense and overly protective parents, and sought solace with her own parents in Scotland. The Ruskin marriage was already undermined as she and Millais fell in love, and Effie left Ruskin, causing a public scandal.

During April 1854, Effie filed her suit of nullity, on grounds of "non-consummation" owing to his "incurable impotency", a charge Ruskin later disputed. Ruskin wrote, "I can prove my virility at once." The annulment was granted in July. Ruskin did not even mention it in his diary. Effie married Millais the following year. The complex reasons for the non-consummation and ultimate failure of the Ruskin marriage are a matter of enduring speculation and debate.

Ruskin continued to support Hunt and Rossetti. He also provided an annuity of £150 in 1855–1857 to Elizabeth Siddal, Rossetti's wife, to encourage her art (and paid for the services of Henry Acland for her medical care). Other artists influenced by the Pre-Raphaelites also received both critical and financial assistance from Ruskin, including John Brett, John William Inchbold, and Edward Burne-Jones, who became a good friend (he called him "Brother Ned"). His father's disapproval of such friends was a further cause of tension between them.

During this period Ruskin wrote regular reviews of the annual exhibitions at the Royal Academy with the title Academy Notes (1855–1859, 1875). They were highly influential, capable of making or breaking reputations. The satirical magazine Punch published the lines (24 May 1856), "I paints and paints,/hears no complaints/And sells before I'm dry,/Till savage Ruskin/He sticks his tusk in/Then nobody will buy."

Ruskin was an art-philanthropist: in March 1861 he gave 48 Turner drawings to the Ashmolean in Oxford, and a further 25 to the Fitzwilliam Museum, Cambridge in May. Ruskin's own work was very distinctive, and he occasionally exhibited his watercolours: in the United States in 1857–58 and 1879, for example; and in England, at the Fine Art Society in 1878, and at the Royal Society of Painters in Watercolour (of which he was an honorary member) in 1879. He created many careful studies of natural forms, based on his detailed botanical, geological and architectural observations. Examples of his work include a painted, floral pilaster decoration in the central room of Wallington Hall in Northumberland, home of his friend Pauline Trevelyan. The stained glass window in the Little Church of St Francis Funtley, Fareham, Hampshire is reputed to have been designed by him. Originally placed in the St. Peter's Church Duntisbourne Abbots near Cirencester, the window depicts the Ascension and the Nativity.

Ruskin's theories also inspired some architects to adapt the Gothic style. Such buildings created what has been called a distinctive "Ruskinian Gothic". Through his friendship with Henry Acland, Ruskin supported attempts to establish what became the Oxford University Museum of Natural History (designed by Benjamin Woodward) — which is the closest thing to a model of this style, but still failed to satisfy Ruskin completely. The many twists and turns in the Museum's development, not least its increasing cost, and the University authorities' less than enthusiastic attitude towards it, proved increasingly frustrating for Ruskin.

=== Ruskin and education ===
The Museum was part of a wider plan to improve science provision at Oxford, something the University initially resisted. Ruskin's first formal teaching role came about in the mid-1850s, when he taught drawing classes (assisted by Dante Gabriel Rossetti) at the Working Men's College, established by the Christian socialists, Frederick James Furnivall and Frederick Denison Maurice. Although Ruskin did not share the founders' politics, he strongly supported the idea that through education workers could achieve a crucially important sense of (self-)fulfilment. One result of this involvement was Ruskin's Elements of Drawing (1857). He had taught several women drawing, by means of correspondence, and his book represented both a response and a challenge to contemporary drawing manuals. The WMC was also a useful recruiting ground for assistants, on some of whom Ruskin would later come to rely, such as his future publisher, George Allen.

From 1859 until 1868, Ruskin was involved with the progressive school for girls at Winnington Hall in Cheshire. A frequent visitor, letter-writer, and donor of pictures and geological specimens to the school, Ruskin approved of the mixture of sports, handicrafts, music and dancing encouraged by its principal, Miss Bell. The association led to Ruskin's sub-Socratic work, The Ethics of the Dust (1866), an imagined conversation with Winnington's girls in which he cast himself as the "Old Lecturer". On the surface a discourse on crystallography, it is a metaphorical exploration of social and political ideals. In the 1880s, Ruskin became involved with another educational institution, Whitelands College, a training college for teachers, where he instituted a May Queen festival that endures today. (It was also replicated in the 19th century at the Cork High School for Girls.) Ruskin also bestowed books and gemstones upon Somerville College, one of Oxford's first two women's colleges, which he visited regularly, and was similarly generous to other educational institutions for women.

=== Modern Painters III and IV ===
Both volumes III and IV of Modern Painters were published in 1856. In MP III Ruskin argued that all great art is "the expression of the spirits of great men". Only the morally and spiritually healthy are capable of admiring the noble and the beautiful, and transforming them into great art by imaginatively penetrating their essence. MP IV presents the geology of the Alps in terms of landscape painting, and their moral and spiritual influence on those living nearby. The contrasting final chapters, "The Mountain Glory" and "The Mountain Gloom" provide an early example of Ruskin's social analysis, highlighting the poverty of the peasants living in the lower Alps.

=== Public lecturer ===
In addition to leading more formal teaching classes, from the 1850s Ruskin became an increasingly popular public lecturer. His first public lectures were given in Edinburgh, in November 1853, on architecture and painting. His lectures at the Art Treasures Exhibition, Manchester in 1857, were collected as The Political Economy of Art and later under Keats's phrase, A Joy For Ever. In these lectures, Ruskin spoke about how to acquire art, and how to use it, arguing that England had forgotten that true wealth is virtue, and that art is an index of a nation's well-being. Individuals have a responsibility to consume wisely, stimulating beneficent demand. The increasingly critical tone and political nature of Ruskin's interventions outraged his father and the "Manchester School" of economists, as represented by a hostile review in the Manchester Examiner and Times. As the Ruskin scholar Helen Gill Viljoen noted, Ruskin was increasingly critical of his father, especially in letters written by Ruskin directly to him, many of them still unpublished.

Ruskin gave the inaugural address at the Cambridge School of Art in 1858, an institution from which the modern-day Anglia Ruskin University has grown. In The Two Paths (1859), five lectures given in London, Manchester, Bradford and Tunbridge Wells, Ruskin argued that a 'vital law' underpins art and architecture, drawing on the labour theory of value. (For other addresses and letters, Cook and Wedderburn, vol. 16, pp. 427–87.) The year 1859 also marked his last tour of Europe with his ageing parents, during which they visited Germany and Switzerland.

=== Turner Bequest ===
Ruskin had been in Venice when he heard about Turner's death in 1851. Being named an executor to Turner's will was an honour that Ruskin respectfully declined, but later took up. Ruskin's book in celebration of the sea, The Harbours of England, revolving around Turner's drawings, was published in 1856. In January 1857, Ruskin's Notes on the Turner Gallery at Marlborough House, 1856 was published. He persuaded the National Gallery to allow him to work on the Turner Bequest of nearly 20,000 individual artworks left to the nation by the artist. This involved Ruskin in an enormous amount of work, completed in May 1858, and involved cataloguing, framing and conserving. Four hundred watercolours were displayed in cabinets of Ruskin's own design. Recent scholarship has argued that Ruskin did not, as previously thought, collude in the destruction of Turner's erotic drawings, but his work on the Bequest did modify his attitude towards Turner. (See below, Controversies: Turner's Erotic Drawings.)

=== Religious struggle ===
In 1858, Ruskin was again travelling in Europe. The tour took him from Switzerland to Turin, where he saw Paolo Veronese's Presentation of the Queen of Sheba at the Galleria Sabauda. He would later claim (in April 1877) that the discovery of this painting, contrasting starkly with a particularly dull sermon that he had listened to at a Waldensian church in Turin, led to his "unconversion" from Evangelical Christianity. He had, however, doubted his Evangelical Christian faith for some time, shaken by Biblical and geological scholarship that was seen as undermining the literal truth and absolute authority of the Bible: "those dreadful hammers!" he wrote to Henry Acland, "I hear the chink of them at the end of every cadence of the Bible verses." This "loss of faith" precipitated a considerable personal crisis. His confidence undermined, he believed that much of his writing to date had been founded on a bed of lies and half-truths. After a long struggle in matters of faith Ruskin returned to Christianity.

=== Social critic and reformer: Unto This Last ===
Whenever I look or travel in England or abroad, I see that men, wherever they can reach, destroy all beauty.

— John Ruskin, Modern Painters V (1860): Ruskin, Cook and Wedderburn, 7.422–423.

Although in 1877 Ruskin said that in 1860, "I gave up my art work and wrote Unto This Last… the central work of my life" the break was not so dramatic or final. Following his crisis of faith, and urged to political and economic work by his professed "master" Thomas Carlyle, to whom he acknowledged that he "owed more than to any other living writer", Ruskin shifted his emphasis in the late 1850s from art towards social issues. Nevertheless, he continued to lecture on and write about a wide range of subjects including art and, among many other matters, geology (in June 1863 he lectured on the Alps), art practice and judgement (The Cestus of Aglaia), botany and mythology (Proserpina and The Queen of the Air). He continued to draw and paint in watercolours, and to travel extensively across Europe with servants and friends. In 1868, his tour took him to Abbeville, and in the following year he was in Verona (studying tombs for the Arundel Society) and Venice (where he was joined by William Holman Hunt). Yet increasingly Ruskin concentrated his energies on fiercely attacking industrial capitalism, and the utilitarian theories of political economy underpinning it. He repudiated his sometimes grandiloquent style, writing now in plainer, simpler language, to communicate his message straightforwardly.

There is no wealth but life. Life, including all its powers of love, of joy, and of admiration. That country is the richest which nourishes the greatest number of noble and happy human beings; that man is richest who, having perfected the functions of his own life to the utmost, has always the widest helpful influence, both personal, and by means of his possessions, over the lives of others.

— John Ruskin, Unto This Last: Cook and Wedderburn, 17.105

Ruskin authored several works on political economy. Ruskin's social view broadened from concerns about the dignity of labour to consider issues of citizenship and notions of the ideal community. Just as he had questioned aesthetic orthodoxy in his earliest writings, he now dissected the orthodox political economy espoused by John Stuart Mill, based on theories of laissez-faire and competition drawn from the work of Adam Smith, David Ricardo and Thomas Malthus. In his four essays Unto This Last, Ruskin rejected the division of labour as dehumanising (separating the labourer from the product of his work), and argued that the false "science" of political economy failed to consider the social affections that bind communities together. He articulated an extended metaphor of household and family, drawing on Plato and Xenophon to demonstrate the communal and sometimes sacrificial nature of true economics. For Ruskin, all economies and societies are ideally founded on a politics of social justice. His ideas influenced the concept of the "social economy", characterised by networks of charitable, co-operative and other non-governmental organisations.

The essays were originally published in consecutive monthly instalments of the new Cornhill Magazine between August and November 1860 (and published in a single volume in 1862). However, the Cornhill's editor, William Makepeace Thackeray, was forced to abandon the series by the outcry of the magazine's largely conservative readership and the fears of a nervous publisher (Smith, Elder & Co.). The reaction of the national press was hostile, and Ruskin was, he claimed, "reprobated in a violent manner". Ruskin's father also strongly disapproved. Others were enthusiastic, including Carlyle, who wrote, "I have read your Paper with exhilaration… Such a thing flung suddenly into half a million dull British heads… will do a great deal of good", declaring that they were "henceforth in a minority of two", a notion which Ruskin seconded.

Ruskin's political ideas, and Unto This Last in particular, later proved highly influential. The essays were praised and paraphrased in Gujarati by Mohandas Gandhi, a wide range of autodidacts cited their positive impact, the economist John A. Hobson and many of the founders of the British Labour party credited them as an influence.

Ruskin believed in a hierarchical social structure. He wrote "I was, and my father was before me, a violent Tory of the old school." He believed in man's duty to God, and while he sought to improve the conditions of the poor, he opposed attempts to level social differences and sought to resolve social inequalities by abandoning capitalism in favour of a co-operative structure of society based on obedience and benevolent philanthropy, rooted in the agricultural economy.

If there be any one point insisted on throughout my works more frequently than another, that one point is the impossibility of Equality. My continual aim has been to show the eternal superiority of some men to others, sometimes even of one man to all others; and to show also the advisability of appointing such persons or person to guide, to lead, or on occasion even to compel and subdue, their inferiors, according to their own better knowledge and wiser will.

— John Ruskin, Unto This Last: Cook and Wedderburn 17.34

Ruskin's explorations of nature and aesthetics in the fifth and final volume of Modern Painters focused on Giorgione, Veronese, Titian and Turner. Ruskin asserted that the components of the greatest artworks are held together, like human communities, in a quasi-organic unity. Competitive struggle is destructive. Uniting Modern Painters V and Unto This Last is Ruskin's "Law of Help":

Government and cooperation are in all things and eternally the laws of life. Anarchy and competition, eternally, and in all things, the laws of death.

— John Ruskin, Modern Painters V and Unto This Last: Cook and Wedderburn 7.207 and 17.25.

Ruskin's next work on political economy, redefining some of the basic terms of the discipline, also ended prematurely, when Fraser's Magazine, under the editorship of James Anthony Froude, cut short his Essays on Political Economy (1862–63) (later collected as Munera Pulveris (1872)). Ruskin further explored political themes in Time and Tide (1867), his letters to Thomas Dixon, a cork-cutter in Sunderland, Tyne and Wear who had a well-established interest in literary and artistic matters. In these letters, Ruskin promoted honesty in work and exchange, just relations in employment and the need for co-operation.

Ruskin's sense of politics was not confined to theory. On his father's death in 1864, he inherited an estate worth between £120,000 and £157,000 (the exact figure is disputed). This considerable fortune, inherited from the father he described on his tombstone as "an entirely honest merchant", gave him the means to engage in personal philanthropy and practical schemes of social amelioration. One of his first actions was to support the housing work of Octavia Hill (originally one of his art pupils): he bought property in Marylebone to aid her philanthropic housing scheme. But Ruskin's endeavours extended to the establishment of a shop selling pure tea in any quantity desired at 29 Paddington Street, Paddington (giving employment to two former Ruskin family servants) and crossing-sweepings to keep the area around the British Museum clean and tidy. Modest as these practical schemes were, they represented a symbolic challenge to the existing state of society. Yet his greatest practical experiments would come in his later years.

In 1865–66, Ruskin became involved in the controversy surrounding Edward John Eyre's suppression of the Morant Bay rebellion. Mill formed the Jamaica Committee for the purpose of holding Governor Eyre accountable for what they perceived to be his unlawful, inhumane, and unnecessary quelling of the insurrection. In response, the Eyre Defence and Aid Fund was formed to support Eyre for having fulfilled his duty to defend order and save the white population from danger; Carlyle served as the chairman. Ruskin allied with the Defence, writing a letter which appeared in the Daily Telegraph in December 1865 ("they are for Liberty, and I am for Lordship; they are Mob's men, and I am a King's man"), donating £100 to the Fund, and giving a speech at Waterloo Place on Pall Mall in September 1866, also reported in the Telegraph. In addition to this, Ruskin "threw himself into" personal work for the Defence, "enlisting recruits, persuading waverers, combating objections."

=== Lectures in the 1860s ===
Ruskin lectured widely in the 1860s, giving the Rede lecture at the University of Cambridge in 1867, for example. He spoke at the British Institution on 'Modern Art', the Working Men's Institute, Camberwell on "Work" and the Royal Military Academy, Woolwich on 'War.' Ruskin's widely admired lecture, Traffic, on the relation between taste and morality, was delivered in April 1864 at Bradford Town Hall, to which he had been invited because of a local debate about the style of a new Exchange building. "I do not care about this Exchange", Ruskin told his audience, "because you don't!" These last three lectures were published in The Crown of Wild Olive (1866).

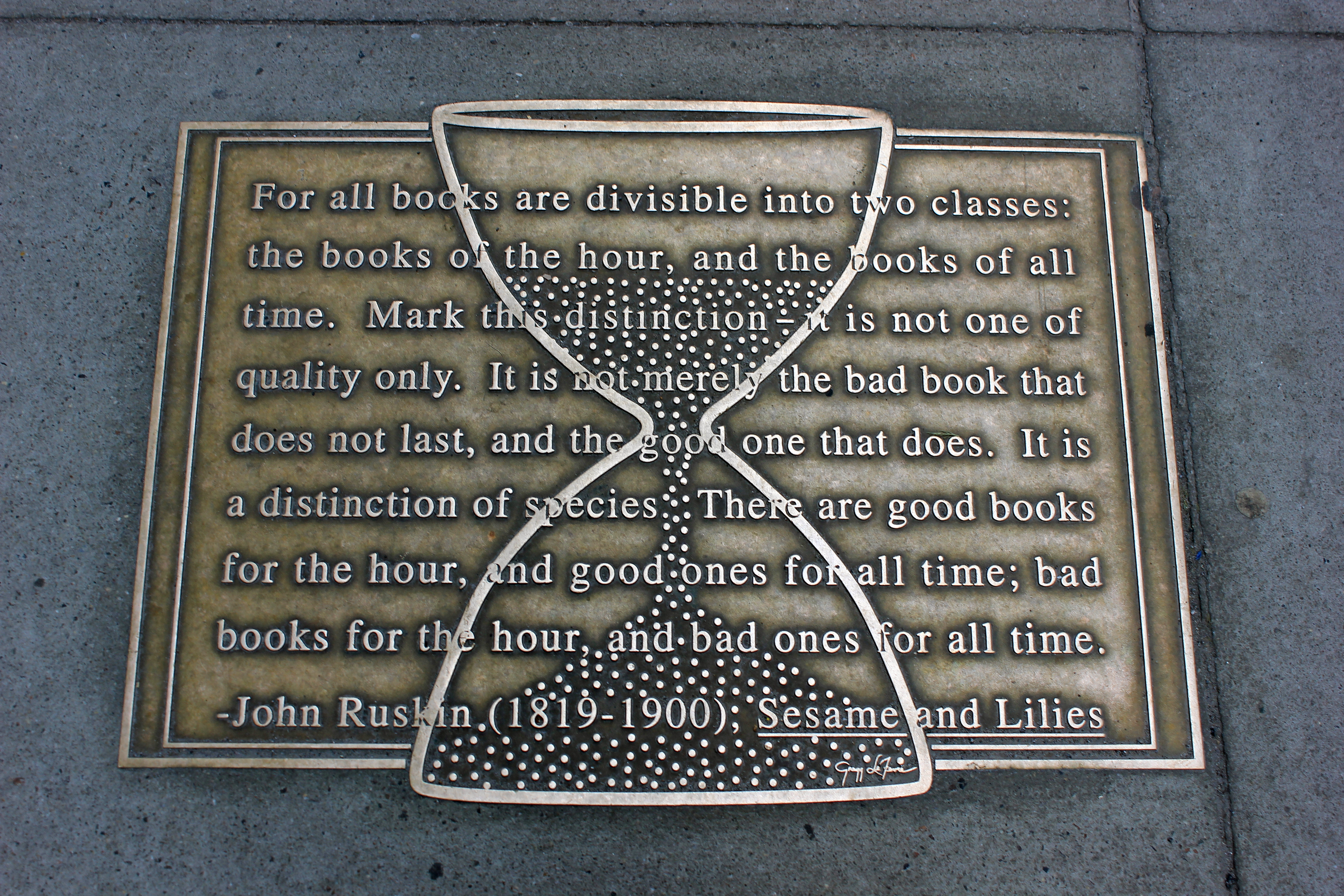
"For all books are divisible into two classes: the books of the hour, and the books of all time" – Sesame and Lilies

The lectures that comprised Sesame and Lilies (published 1865), delivered in December 1864 at the town halls at Rusholme and Manchester, are essentially concerned with education and ideal conduct. "Of Kings' Treasuries" (in support of a library fund) explored issues of reading practice, literature (books of the hour vs. books of all time), cultural value and public education. "Of Queens' Gardens" (supporting a school fund) focused on the role of women, asserting their rights and duties in education, according them responsibility for the household and, by extension, for providing the human compassion that must balance a social order dominated by men. This book proved to be one of Ruskin's most popular, and was regularly awarded as a Sunday School prize. Its reception over time, however, has been more mixed, and twentieth-century feminists have taken aim at "Of Queens' Gardens" in particular, as an attempt to "subvert the new heresy" of women's rights by confining women to the domestic sphere. Although indeed subscribing to the Victorian belief in "separate spheres" for men and women, Ruskin was however unusual in arguing for parity of esteem, a case based on his philosophy that a nation's political economy should be modelled on that of the ideal household.

== Later life (1869–1900) ==
=== Oxford's first Slade Professor of Fine Art ===
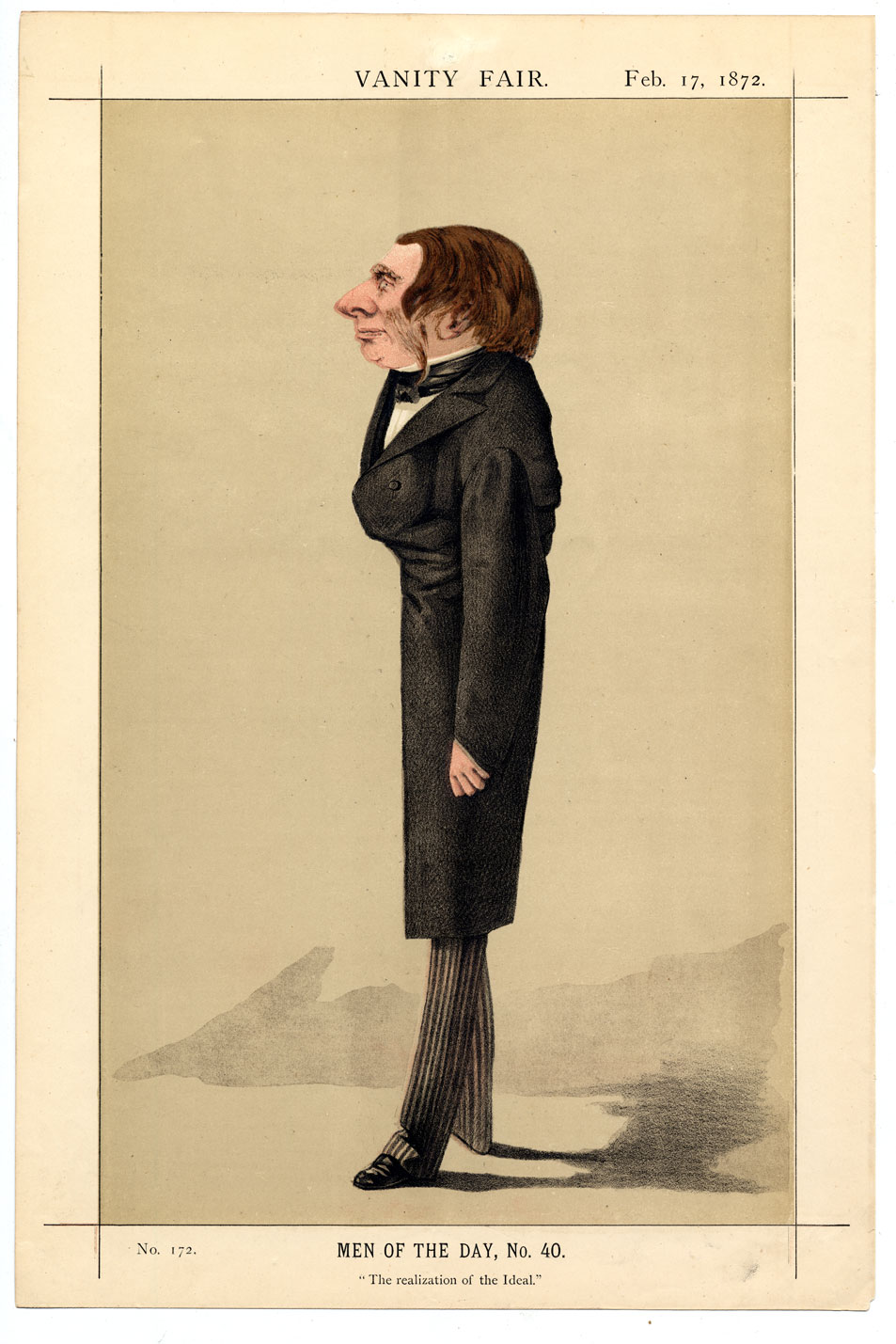
Caricature by Adriano Cecioni published in Vanity Fair in 1872

Ruskin was unanimously appointed the first Slade Professor of Fine Art at Oxford University in August 1869, though largely through the offices of his friend, Henry Acland. He delivered his inaugural lecture on his 51st birthday in 1870, at the Sheldonian Theatre to a larger-than-expected audience. It was here that he said, "The art of any country is the exponent of its social and political virtues… she [England] must found colonies as fast and as far as she is able, formed of her most energetic and worthiest men;—seizing every piece of fruitful waste ground she can set her foot on…" It has been claimed that Cecil Rhodes cherished a long-hand copy of the lecture, believing that it supported his own view of the British Empire.

In 1871, John Ruskin founded his own art school at Oxford, The Ruskin School of Drawing and Fine Art. It was originally accommodated within the Ashmolean Museum but now occupies premises on High Street. Ruskin endowed the drawing mastership with £5000 of his own money. He also established a large collection of drawings, watercolours and other materials (over 800 frames) that he used to illustrate his lectures. The School challenged the orthodox, mechanical methodology of the government art schools (the "South Kensington System").

Ruskin's lectures were often so popular that they had to be given twice—once for the students, and again for the public. Most of them were eventually published (see Select Bibliography below). He lectured on a wide range of subjects at Oxford: his interpretation of "Art" encompassing almost every conceivable area of study, including wood and metal engraving (Ariadne Florentina), the relation of science to art (The Eagle's Nest) and sculpture (Aratra Pentelici). His lectures ranged through myth, ornithology, geology, nature-study and literature. "The teaching of Art…", Ruskin wrote, "is the teaching of all things." Ruskin was never careful about offending his employer. When he criticised Michelangelo in a lecture in June 1871 it was seen as an attack on the large collection of that artist's work in the Ashmolean Museum.

Most controversial, from the point of view of the University authorities, spectators and the national press, was the digging scheme on Ferry Hinksey Road at North Hinksey, near Oxford, instigated by Ruskin in 1874, and continuing into 1875, which involved undergraduates in a road-mending scheme. The scheme was motivated in part by a desire to teach the virtues of wholesome manual labour. Some of the diggers, who included Oscar Wilde, Alfred Milner and Ruskin's future secretary and biographer W. G. Collingwood, were profoundly influenced by the experience: notably Arnold Toynbee, Leonard A. Montefiore and Alexander Robertson MacEwen. It helped to foster a public service ethic that was later given expression in the university settlements, and was keenly celebrated by the founders of Ruskin Hall, Oxford.

In 1879, Ruskin resigned from Oxford, a decision forced on him partly because of his declining health and finally precipitated by the Whistler trial. He resumed his Professorship in 1883, only to resign again in 1884. He gave his reason as opposition to vivisection, but he had increasingly been in conflict with the University authorities, who refused to expand his Drawing School.

=== Fors Clavigera and the Whistler libel case ===
In January 1871, the month before Ruskin started to lecture the wealthy undergraduates at Oxford University, he began his series of 96 (monthly) "letters to the workmen and labourers of Great Britain" under the title Fors Clavigera (1871–84). (The letters were published irregularly after the 87th instalment in March 1878.) These letters were personal, dealt with every subject in his oeuvre, and were written in a variety of styles, reflecting his mood and circumstances. From 1873, Ruskin had full control over all his publications, having established George Allen as his sole publisher (see Allen & Unwin).

For Mr Whistler's own sake, no less for the protection of the purchaser, Sir Coutts Lindsay ought not to have omitted works into the gallery in which the ill-educated conceit of the artist so nearly approached the aspect of wilful imposture. I have seen, and heard, much of cockney impudence before now, but never expected to hear a coxcomb ask two hundred guineas for flinging a pot of paint in the public's face.

— John Ruskin, Fors Clavigera (1877)

In the July 1877 letter of Fors Clavigera, Ruskin launched a scathing attack on paintings by James McNeill Whistler exhibited at the Grosvenor Gallery. He found particular fault with Nocturne in Black and Gold: The Falling Rocket, and accused Whistler of asking two hundred guineas for "flinging a pot of paint in the public's face". Whistler filed a libel suit against Ruskin, but Ruskin was ill when the case went to trial in November 1878, so the artist Edward Burne-Jones and Attorney General Sir John Holker represented him. The trial took place on 25 and 26 November, and many major figures of the art world at the time appeared at the trial. Artist Albert Moore appeared as a witness for Whistler, and artist William Powell Frith appeared for Ruskin. Frith said "the nocturne in black in gold is not in my opinion worth two hundred guineas". Frederic Leighton also agreed to give evidence for Whistler, but in the end could not attend as he had to go to Windsor to be knighted. Edward Burne-Jones, representing Ruskin, also asserted that Nocturne in Black and Gold was not a serious work of art. When asked to give reasons, Burne-Jones said he had never seen one painting of night that was successful, but also acknowledged that he saw marks of great labour and artistic skill in the painting. In the end, Whistler won the case, but the jury awarded damages of only a derisory farthing (the smallest coin of the realm) to the artist. Court costs were split between the two parties. Ruskin's were paid by public subscription organised by the Fine Art Society, but Whistler was bankrupt within six months, and was forced to sell his house on Tite Street in London and move to Venice. The episode tarnished Ruskin's reputation and may have accelerated his mental decline. It did nothing to mitigate Ruskin's exaggerated sense of failure in persuading his readers to share in his own keenly felt priorities.

=== Guild of St George ===
Ruskin founded his utopian society, the Guild of St George, in 1871 (although originally it was called St George's Fund, and then St George's Company, before becoming the Guild in 1878). Its aims and objectives were articulated in Fors Clavigera. A communitarian protest against nineteenth-century industrial capitalism, it had a hierarchical structure, with Ruskin as its Master, and dedicated members called "Companions". Ruskin wished to show that contemporary life could still be enjoyed in the countryside, with land being farmed by traditional means, in harmony with the environment, and with the minimum of mechanical assistance. He also sought to educate and enrich the lives of industrial workers by inspiring them with beautiful objects. Toward this end, with a tithe (or personal donation) of £7,000, Ruskin acquired land and a collection of art treasures.

Ruskin purchased land initially in Totley, near Sheffield, but the agricultural scheme established there by local communists met with only modest success after many difficulties. Donations of land from wealthy and dedicated Companions eventually placed land and property in the Guild's care: in the Wyre Forest, near Bewdley, Worcestershire, called Ruskin Land today; Barmouth, in Gwynedd, north-west Wales; Cloughton, in North Yorkshire; Westmill in Hertfordshire; and Sheepscombe, Gloucestershire.

In principle, Ruskin worked out a scheme for different grades of "Companion", wrote codes of practice, described styles of dress and even designed the Guild's own coins. Ruskin wished to see St George's Schools established, and published various volumes to aid its teaching (his Bibliotheca Pastorum or Shepherd's Library), but the schools themselves were never established. (In the 1880s, in a venture loosely related to the Bibliotheca, he supported Francesca Alexander's publication of some of her tales of peasant life.) In reality, the Guild, which still exists today as a charitable education trust, has only ever operated on a small scale.

Ruskin also wished to see traditional rural handicrafts revived. St. George's Mill was established at Laxey, Isle of Man, producing cloth goods. The Guild also encouraged independent but allied efforts in spinning and weaving at Langdale, in other parts of the Lake District and elsewhere, producing linen and other goods exhibited by the Home Arts and Industries Association and similar organisations.

The Guild's most conspicuous and enduring achievement was the creation of a remarkable collection of art, minerals, books, medieval manuscripts, architectural casts, coins and other precious and beautiful objects. Housed in a cottage museum high on a hill in the Sheffield district of Walkley, it opened in 1875, and was curated by Henry and Emily Swan. Ruskin had written in Modern Painters III (1856) that, "the greatest thing a human soul ever does in this world is to see something, and to tell what it saw in a plain way." Through the Museum, Ruskin aimed to bring to the eyes of the working man many of the sights and experiences otherwise reserved for those who could afford to travel across Europe. The original Museum has been digitally recreated online. In 1890, the Museum relocated to Meersbrook Park. The collection is now on display at Sheffield's Millennium Gallery.

=== Rose La Touche ===
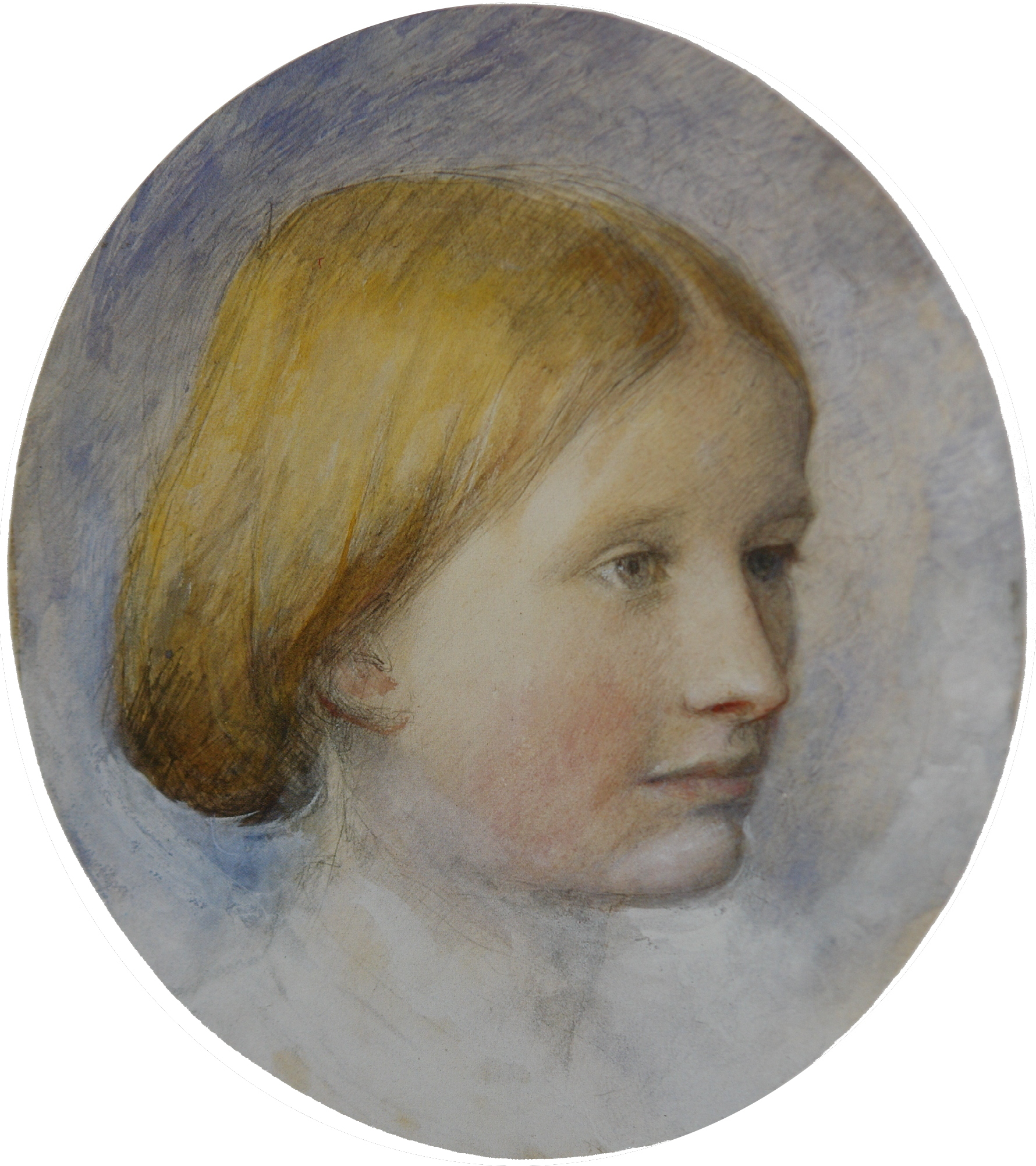
Rose La Touche, as sketched by Ruskin

Ruskin had been introduced to the wealthy Irish La Touche family by Louisa, Marchioness of Waterford. Maria La Touche, a minor Irish poet and novelist, asked Ruskin to teach her daughters drawing and painting in 1858. Rose La Touche was ten. His first meeting came at a time when Ruskin's own religious faith was under strain. This always caused difficulties for the staunchly Protestant La Touche family who at various times prevented the two from meeting. A chance meeting at the Royal Academy in 1869 was one of the few occasions they came into personal contact. After a long illness, she died on 25 May 1875, at the age of 27. These events plunged Ruskin into despair and led to increasingly severe bouts of mental illness involving breakdowns and delirious visions. The first of these had occurred in 1871 at Matlock, Derbyshire, a town and a county that he knew from his boyhood travels, whose flora, fauna, and minerals helped to form and reinforce his appreciation and understanding of nature.

Ruskin turned to spiritualism. He attended séances at Broadlands. Ruskin's increasing need to believe in a meaningful universe and a life after death, both for himself and his loved ones, helped to revive his Christian faith in the 1870s.

=== Travel guides ===
Ruskin continued to travel, studying the landscapes, buildings and art of Europe. In May 1870 and June 1872 he admired Carpaccio's St Ursula in Venice, a vision of which, associated with Rose La Touche, would haunt him, described in the pages of Fors. In 1874, on his tour of Italy, Ruskin visited Sicily, the furthest he ever travelled.

Ruskin embraced the emerging literary forms, the travel guide (and gallery guide), writing new works, and adapting old ones "to give", he said, "what guidance I may to travellers…" The Stones of Venice was revised, edited and issued in a new "Travellers' Edition" in 1879. Ruskin directed his readers, the would-be traveller, to look with his cultural gaze at the landscapes, buildings and art of France and Italy: Mornings in Florence (1875–1877), The Bible of Amiens (1880–1885) (a close study of its sculpture and a wider history), St Mark's Rest (1877–1884) and A Guide to the Principal Pictures in… Venice (1877).

=== Final writings ===
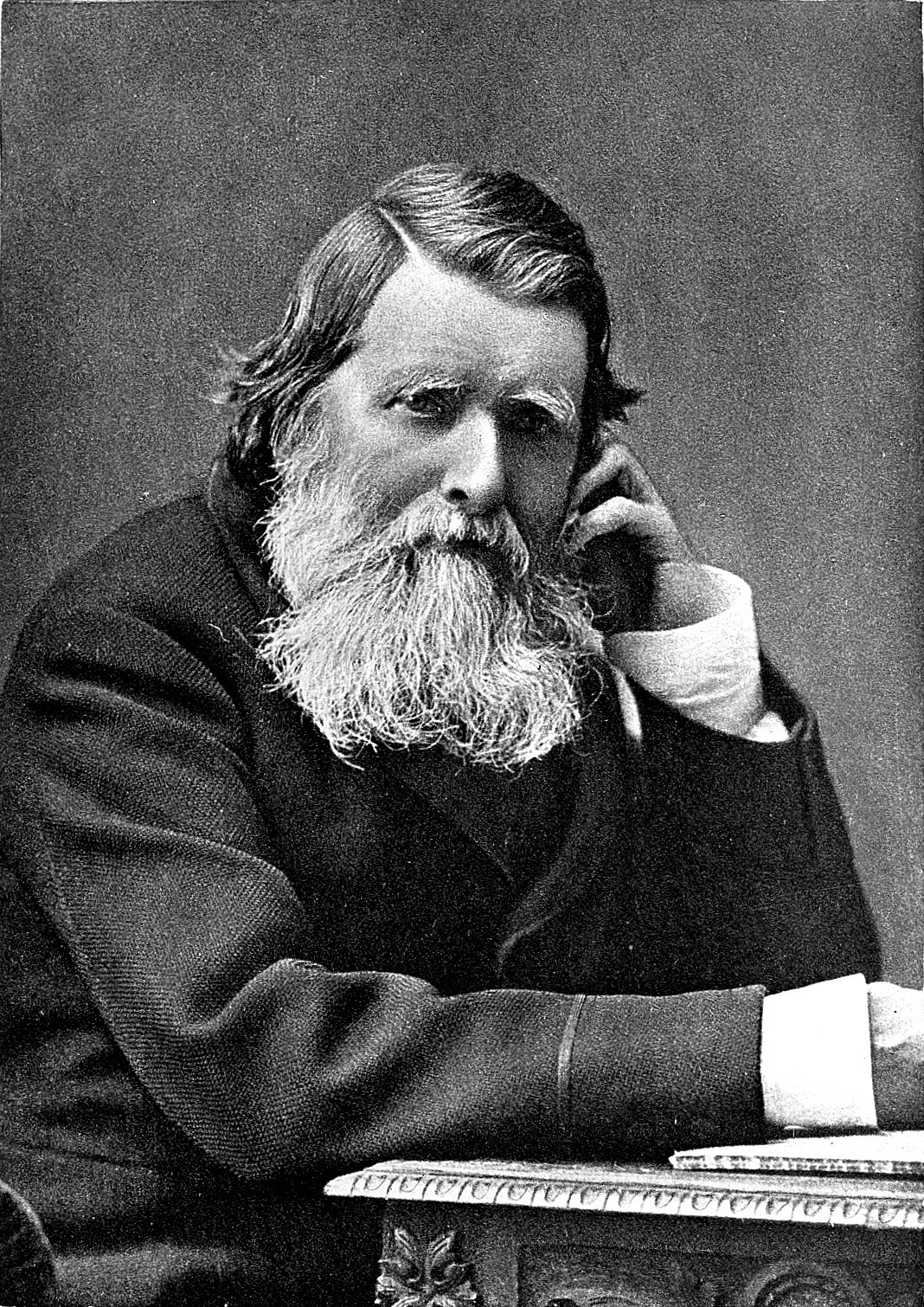
John Ruskin in 1882

In the 1880s, Ruskin returned to some literature and themes that had been among his favourites since childhood. He wrote about Scott, Byron and Wordsworth in Fiction, Fair and Foul (1880) in which, as Seth Reno argues, he describes the devastating effects on the landscape caused by industrialization, a vision Reno sees as a realization of the Anthropocene. He returned to meteorological observations in his lectures, The Storm-Cloud of the Nineteenth-Century (1884), describing the apparent effects of industrialisation on weather patterns. Ruskin's Storm-Cloud has been seen as foreshadowing environmentalism and related concerns in the 20th and 21st centuries. Ruskin's prophetic writings were also tied to his emotions, and his more general (ethical) dissatisfaction with the modern world with which he now felt almost completely out of sympathy.

His last great work was his autobiography, Praeterita (1885–1889) (meaning, 'Of Past Things'), a highly personalised, selective, eloquent but incomplete account of aspects of his life, the preface of which was written in his childhood nursery at Herne Hill.

The period from the late 1880s was one of steady and inexorable decline. Gradually it became too difficult for him to travel to Europe. He suffered a complete mental collapse on his final tour, (which included Beauvais, Sallanches and Venice, in 1888) from which he never fully recovered. The emergence and dominance of the Aesthetic movement and Impressionism distanced Ruskin from the modern art world, his ideas on the social utility of art contrasting with the doctrine of "l'art pour l'art" or "art for art's sake" that was beginning to dominate. His later writings were increasingly seen as irrelevant, especially as he seemed to be more interested in book illustrators such as Kate Greenaway than in modern art. He also attacked aspects of Darwinian theory with increasing violence, although he knew and respected Darwin personally.

=== Brantwood and final years ===
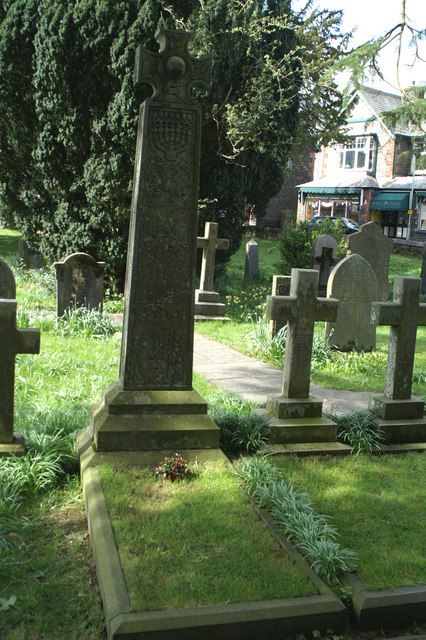
Grave of John Ruskin, in Coniston churchyard

In August 1871, Ruskin purchased, from W. J. Linton, the then somewhat dilapidated Brantwood house, on the shores of Coniston Water, in the English Lake District, paying £1500 for it. Brantwood was Ruskin's main home from 1872 until his death. His estate provided a site for more of his practical schemes and experiments: he had an ice house built, and the gardens comprehensively rearranged. He oversaw the construction of a larger harbour (from where he rowed his boat, the Jumping Jenny), and he altered the house (adding a dining room, a turret to his bedroom to give him a panoramic view of the lake, and he later extended the property to accommodate his relatives). He built a reservoir and redirected the waterfall down the hills, adding a slate seat that faced the tumbling stream and craggy rocks rather than the lake, so that he could closely observe the fauna and flora of the hillside.

Although Ruskin's 80th birthday was widely celebrated in 1899 (various Ruskin societies presenting him with an elaborately illuminated congratulatory address), Ruskin was scarcely aware of it. He died at Brantwood from influenza on 20 January 1900 at the age of 80. He was buried five days later in the churchyard at Coniston, according to his wishes. As he had grown weaker, suffering prolonged bouts of mental illness, he had been looked after by his second cousin, Joan(na) Severn (formerly "companion" to Ruskin's mother) and she and her family inherited his estate. Joanna's Care was the eloquent final chapter of Ruskin's memoir, which he dedicated to her as a fitting tribute.

Joan Severn, together with Ruskin's secretary, W. G. Collingwood, and his eminent American friend Charles Eliot Norton, were executors to his will. E. T. Cook and Alexander Wedderburn edited the monumental 39-volume Library Edition of Ruskin's Works, the last volume of which, an index, attempts to demonstrate the complex interconnectedness of Ruskin's thought. They all acted together to guard, and even control, Ruskin's public and personal reputation.

The centenary of Ruskin's birth was keenly celebrated in 1919, but his reputation was already in decline and sank further in the fifty years that followed. The contents of Ruskin's home were dispersed in a series of sales at auction, and Brantwood itself was bought in 1932 by the educationist and Ruskin enthusiast, collector and memorialist, John Howard Whitehouse.

Brantwood was opened in 1934 as a memorial to Ruskin and remains open to the public today. The Guild of St George continues to thrive as an educational charity, and has an international membership. The Ruskin Society organises events throughout the year. A series of public celebrations of Ruskin's multiple legacies took place in 2000, on the centenary of his death, and events are planned throughout 2019, to mark the bicentenary of his birth.

=== Personal appearance ===
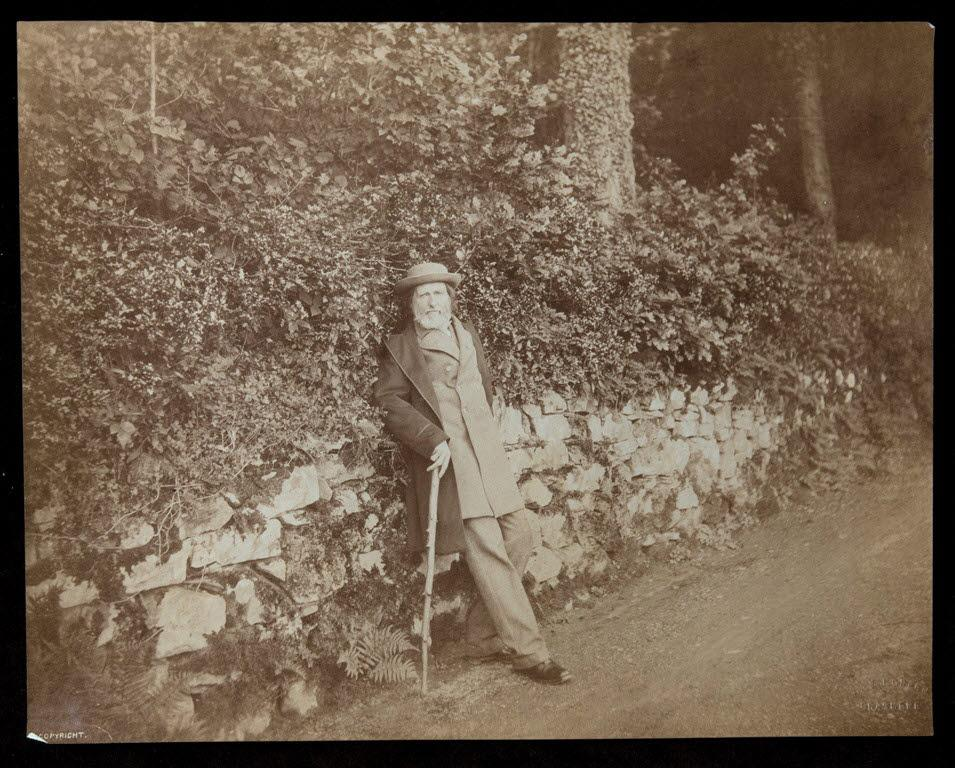
Portrait of John Ruskin, leaning against a wall at Brantwood, 1885

In middle age, and at his prime as a lecturer, Ruskin was described as slim, perhaps a little short, with an aquiline nose and brilliant, piercing blue eyes. Often sporting a double-breasted waistcoat, a high collar and, when necessary, a frock coat, he also wore his trademark blue neckcloth. From 1878 he cultivated an increasingly long beard, and took on the appearance of an "Old Testament" prophet.

=== Ruskin in the eyes of a student ===
The following description of Ruskin as a lecturer was written by an eyewitness, who was a student at the time (1884):

[Ruskin's] election to the second term of the Slade professorship took place in 1884, and he was announced to lecture at the Science Schools, by the park. I went off, never dreaming of difficulty about getting into any professorial lecture; but all the accesses were blocked, and finally I squeezed in between the Vice-Chancellor and his attendants as they forced a passage. All the young women in Oxford and all the girls' schools had got in before us and filled the semi-circular auditorium. Every inch was crowded, and still no lecturer; and it was not apparent how he could arrive. Presently there was a commotion in the doorway, and over the heads and shoulders of tightly packed young men, a loose bundle was handed in and down the steps, till on the floor a small figure was deposited, which stood up and shook itself out, amused and good humoured, climbed on to the dais, spread out papers and began to read in a pleasant though fluting voice. Long hair, brown with grey through it; a soft brown beard, also streaked with grey; some loose kind of black garment (possibly to be described as a frock coat) with a master's gown over it; loose baggy trousers, a thin gold chain round his neck with glass suspended, a lump of soft tie of some finely spun blue silk; and eyes much bluer than the tie: that was Ruskin as he came back to Oxford.

— Stephen Gwynn, Experiences of a Literary Man (1926)

An incident where the Arts and Crafts master William Morris had aroused the anger of Dr Bright, Master of University College, Oxford, served to demonstrate Ruskin's charisma:

William Morris had come to lecture on "Art and plutocracy" in the hall of University College. The title did not suggest an exhortation to join a Socialist alliance, but that was what we got. When he ended, the Master of University, Dr Bright, stood up and instead of returning thanks, protested that the hall had been lent for a lecture on art and would certainly not have been made available for preaching Socialism. He stammered a little at all times, and now, finding the ungracious words literally stick in his throat, sat down, leaving the remonstrance incomplete but clearly indicated. The situation was most unpleasant. Morris at any time was choleric and his face flamed red over his white shirt front: he probably thought he had conceded enough by assuming against his usage a conventional garb. There was a hubbub, and then from the audience Ruskin rose and instantly there was quiet. With a few courteous well chosen sentences he made everybody feel that we were an assembly of gentlemen, that Morris was not only an artist but a gentleman and an Oxford man, and had said or done nothing which gentlemen in Oxford should resent; and the whole storm subsided before that gentle authority.

— Stephen Gwynn, Experiences of a Literary Man (1926)

== Legacy ==
=== International ===
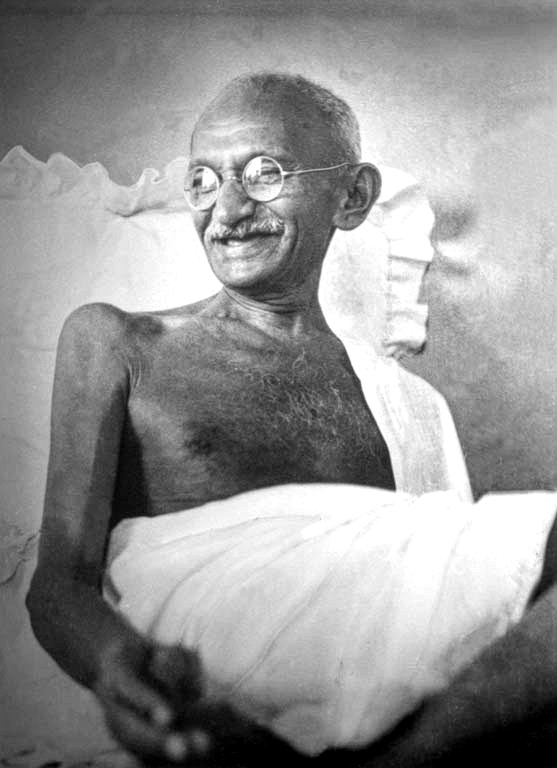
Mahatma Gandhi was inspired by Ruskin's 1860 work Unto This Last.

Ruskin's influence reached across the world. Tolstoy described him as "one of the most remarkable men not only of England and of our generation, but of all countries and times" and quoted extensively from him, rendering his ideas into Russian. Proust not only admired Ruskin but helped translate his works into French, describing him as "for me one of the greatest writers of all times and of all countries". Gandhi wrote of the "magic spell" cast on him by Unto This Last and paraphrased the work in Gujarati, calling it Sarvodaya, "The Advancement of All". In Japan, Ryuzo Mikimoto actively collaborated in Ruskin's translation. He commissioned sculptures and sundry commemorative items, and incorporated Ruskinian rose motifs in the jewellery produced by his cultured pearl empire. He established the Ruskin Society of Tokyo and his children built a dedicated library to house his Ruskin collection.

A number of utopian socialist Ruskin Colonies attempted to put his political ideals into practice. These communities included Ruskin, Florida, Ruskin, British Columbia and the Ruskin Commonwealth Association, a colony in Dickson County, Tennessee in existence from 1894 to 1899. One of Ruskin's students, Ralph Radcliffe Whitehead, founded the Byrdcliffe Colony in Woodstock, New York, partly inspired by his teacher's beliefs.

Ruskin's work has been translated into numerous languages including, in addition to those already mentioned (Russian, French, Japanese): German, Italian, Catalan, Spanish, Portuguese, Hungarian, Polish, Romanian, Swedish, Danish, Dutch, Czech, Chinese, Welsh, Esperanto, Gikuyu, and several Indian languages such as Kannada.

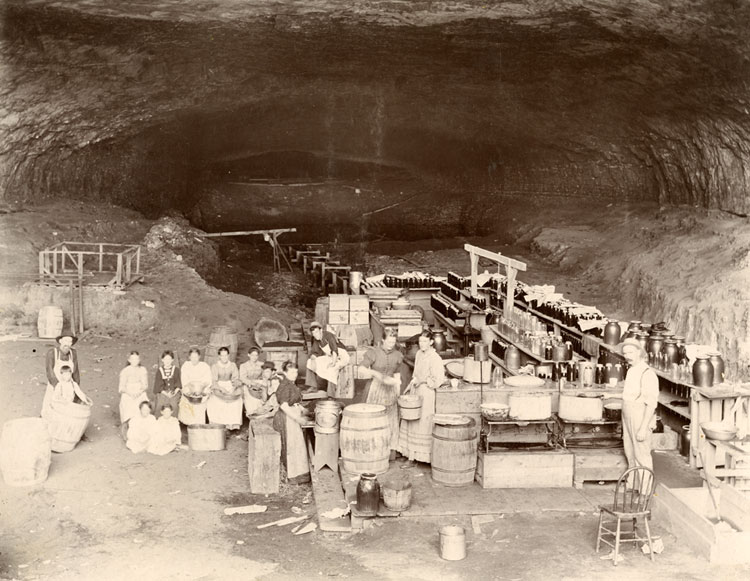
Cannery operation in the Ruskin Cooperative, 1896

=== Art, architecture and literature ===
Theorists and practitioners in a broad range of disciplines acknowledged their debt to Ruskin. Architects including Le Corbusier, Louis Sullivan, Frank Lloyd Wright and Walter Gropius incorporated his ideas in their work. Writers as diverse as Oscar Wilde, G. K. Chesterton, Hilaire Belloc, T. S. Eliot, W. B. Yeats and Ezra Pound felt Ruskin's influence. The American poet Marianne Moore was an enthusiastic Ruskin reader. Art historians and critics, among them Herbert Read, Roger Fry and Wilhelm Worringer, knew Ruskin's work well. Admirers ranged from the British-born American watercolourist and engraver John William Hill to the sculptor-designer, printmaker and utopianist Eric Gill. Explorer Edward Wilson used his works as an influence as while painting scientific and artistic sketches and watercolours of the Terra Nova Expedition. Aside from E. T. Cook, Ruskin's editor and biographer, other leading British journalists influenced by Ruskin include J. A. Spender, and the war correspondent H. W. Nevinson.

No true disciple of mine will ever be a "Ruskinian"! – he will follow, not me, but the instincts of his own soul, and the guidance of its Creator.

— Cook and Wedderburn, 24.357.

=== Craft and conservation ===
William Morris and C. R. Ashbee (of the Guild of Handicraft) were keen disciples, and through them Ruskin's legacy can be traced in the Arts and Crafts movement. Ruskin's ideas on the preservation of open spaces and the conservation of historic buildings and places inspired his friends Octavia Hill and Hardwicke Rawnsley to help found the National Trust.

=== Society, education and sport ===
Pioneers of town planning such as Thomas Coglan Horsfall and Patrick Geddes called Ruskin an inspiration and invoked his ideas in justification of their own social interventions; likewise the founders of the garden city movement, Ebenezer Howard and Raymond Unwin.

Edward Carpenter's community in Millthorpe, Derbyshire was partly inspired by Ruskin, and John Kenworthy's colony at Purleigh, Essex, which was briefly a refuge for the Doukhobors, combined Ruskin's ideas and Tolstoy's.

The most prolific collector of Ruskiniana was John Howard Whitehouse, who saved Ruskin's home, Brantwood, and opened it as a permanent Ruskin memorial. Inspired by Ruskin's educational ideals, Whitehouse established Bembridge School, on the Isle of Wight, and ran it along Ruskinian lines. Educationists from William Jolly to Michael Ernest Sadler wrote about and appreciated Ruskin's ideas. Ruskin College, an educational establishment in Oxford originally intended for working men, was named after him by its American founders, Walter Vrooman and Charles A. Beard.

Ruskin's innovative publishing experiment, conducted by his one-time Working Men's College pupil George Allen, whose business was eventually merged to become Allen & Unwin, anticipated the establishment of the Net Book Agreement.

Ruskin's Drawing Collection, a collection of 1470 works of art he gathered as learning aids for the Ruskin School of Drawing and Fine Art (which he founded at Oxford), is at the Ashmolean Museum. The Museum has promoted Ruskin's art teaching, utilising the collection for in-person and online drawing courses.

Pierre de Coubertin, the innovator of the modern Olympic Games, cited Ruskin's principles of beautification, asserting that the games should be "Ruskinised" to create an aesthetic identity that transcended mere championship competitions.

=== Politics and critique of political economy ===
Ruskin was an inspiration for many Christian socialists, and his ideas informed the work of economists such as William Smart and J. A. Hobson, and the positivist Frederic Harrison. Ruskin was discussed in university extension classes, and in reading circles and societies formed in his name. He helped to inspire the settlement movement in Britain and the United States. Resident workers at Toynbee Hall such as the future civil servants Hubert Llewellyn Smith and William Beveridge (author of the Report … on Social Insurance and Allied Services), and the future Prime Minister Clement Attlee acknowledged their debt to Ruskin as they helped to found the British welfare state. More of the British Labour Party's earliest MPs acknowledged Ruskin's influence than mentioned Karl Marx or the Bible. In Nazi Germany, Ruskin was seen as an early British National Socialist. William Montgomery McGovern's From Luther to Hitler (1941) identified Ruskin as a thinker who made Nazism possible, and one 1930s German headmaster told his students that "Carlyle and Ruskin were the first National Socialists." More recently, Ruskin's works have also influenced Phillip Blond and the Red Tory movement.

=== Ruskin in the 21st century ===
In 2019, Ruskin200 was inaugurated as a year-long celebration marking the bicentenary of Ruskin's birth.

Admirers and scholars of Ruskin can visit the Ruskin Library at Lancaster University, Ruskin's home, Brantwood, and the Ruskin Museum, both in Coniston in the English Lake District. All three mount regular exhibitions open to the public all the year round. Barony House in Edinburgh is home to a descendant of John Ruskin. She has designed and hand painted various friezes in honour of her ancestor and it is open to the public. Ruskin's Guild of St George continues his work today, in education, the arts, crafts, and the rural economy.

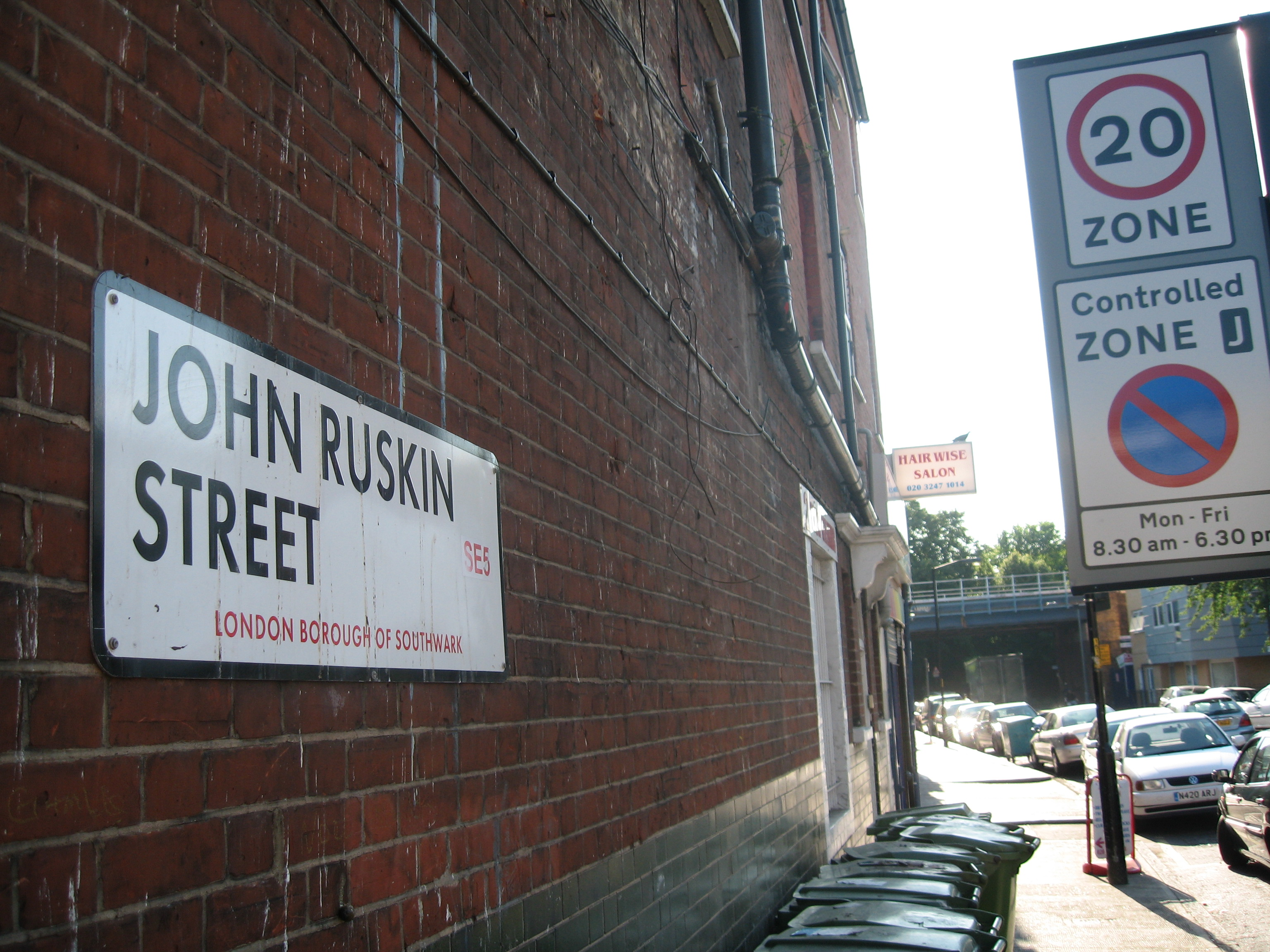
John Ruskin Street in Walworth, London

Many streets, buildings, organisations and institutions bear his name: The Priory Ruskin Academy in Grantham, Lincolnshire; John Ruskin College, South Croydon; and Anglia Ruskin University in Chelmsford and Cambridge, which traces its origins to the Cambridge School of Art, at the foundation of which Ruskin spoke in 1858. Also, the Ruskin Literary and Debating Society, (founded in 1900 in Toronto, Ontario, Canada), the oldest surviving club of its type, and still promoting the development of literary knowledge and public speaking today; and the Ruskin Art Club in Los Angeles, which still exists. In addition, there is the Ruskin Pottery, Ruskin House, Croydon and Ruskin Hall at the University of Pittsburgh.

Ruskin, Florida, United States—site of one of the short-lived American Ruskin Colleges—is named after John Ruskin. There is a mural by Michael Parker (artist) of Ruskin titled "Head, Heart and Hands" on a building across from the Ruskin Post Office.

Since 2000, scholarly research has focused on aspects of Ruskin's legacy, including his impact on the sciences; John Lubbock and Oliver Lodge admired him. Two major academic projects have looked at Ruskin and cultural tourism (investigating, for example, Ruskin's links with Thomas Cook); the other focuses on Ruskin and the theatre. The sociologist and media theorist David Gauntlett argues that Ruskin's notions of craft can be felt today in online communities such as YouTube and throughout Web 2.0. Similarly, architectural theorist Lars Spuybroek has argued that Ruskin's understanding of the Gothic as a combination of two types of variation, rough savageness and smooth changefulness, opens up a new way of thinking leading to digital and so-called parametric design.

Notable Ruskin enthusiasts include the writers Geoffrey Hill and Charles Tomlinson, and the politicians Patrick Cormack, Frank Judd, Frank Field and Tony Benn. In 2006, Chris Smith, Baron Smith of Finsbury, Raficq Abdulla, Jonathon Porritt and Nicholas Wright were among those to contribute to the symposium, There is no wealth but life: Ruskin in the 21st Century. Jonathan Glancey at The Guardian and Andrew Hill at the Financial Times have both written about Ruskin, as has the broadcaster Melvyn Bragg. In 2015, inspired by Ruskin's philosophy of education, Marc Turtletaub founded Meristem in Fair Oaks, California. The centre educates adolescents with developmental differences using Ruskin's "land and craft" ideals, transitioning them so they will succeed as adults in an evolving post-industrial society.

== Theory and criticism ==
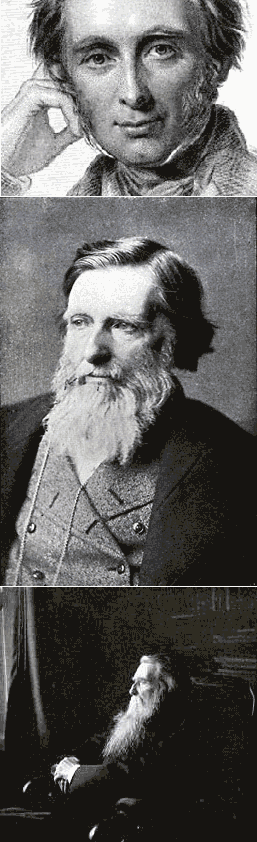
Upper: Steel-plate engraving of Ruskin as a young man, c. 1845, print made c. 1895. Middle: Ruskin in middle-age, as Slade Professor of Art at Oxford (1869–1879), from a 1879 book. Bottom: John Ruskin in old age by Frederick Hollyer, 1894 print

Ruskin wrote over 250 works, initially art criticism and history, but expanding to cover topics ranging over science, geology, ornithology, literary criticism, the environmental effects of pollution, mythology, travel, political economy and social reform. After his death Ruskin's works were collected in the 39-volume "Library Edition", completed in 1912 by his friends Edward Tyas Cook and Alexander Wedderburn. The range and quantity of Ruskin's writing, and its complex, allusive and associative method of expression, cause certain difficulties. In 1898, John A. Hobson observed that in attempting to summarise Ruskin's thought, and by extracting passages from across his work, "the spell of his eloquence is broken". Clive Wilmer has written, further, that, "The anthologising of short purple passages, removed from their intended contexts [… is] something which Ruskin himself detested and which has bedevilled his reputation from the start." Nevertheless, some aspects of Ruskin's theory and criticism require further consideration.

=== Art and design criticism ===
Ruskin's early work defended the reputation of J. M. W. Turner. He believed that all great art should communicate an understanding and appreciation of nature. Accordingly, inherited artistic conventions should be rejected. Only by means of direct observation can an artist, through form and colour, represent nature in art. He advised artists in Modern Painters I to: "go to Nature in all singleness of heart… rejecting nothing, selecting nothing and scorning nothing." By the 1850s. Ruskin was celebrating the Pre-Raphaelites, whose members, he said, had formed "a new and noble school" of art that would provide a basis for a thoroughgoing reform of the art world. For Ruskin, art should communicate truth above all things. However, this could not be revealed by mere display of skill, and must be an expression of the artist's whole moral outlook. Ruskin rejected the work of Whistler because he considered it to epitomise a reductive mechanisation of art.

Ruskin's strong rejection of Classical tradition in The Stones of Venice typifies the inextricable mix of aesthetics and morality in his thought: "Pagan in its origin, proud and unholy in its revival, paralysed in its old age… an architecture invented, as it seems, to make plagiarists of its architects, slaves of its workmen, and sybarites of its inhabitants; an architecture in which intellect is idle, invention impossible, but in which all luxury is gratified and all insolence fortified." Rejection of mechanisation and standardisation informed Ruskin's theories of architecture, and his emphasis on the importance of the Medieval Gothic style. He praised the Gothic for what he saw as its reverence for nature and natural forms; the free, unfettered expression of artisans constructing and decorating buildings; and for the organic relationship he perceived between worker and guild, worker and community, worker and natural environment, and between worker and God. Attempts in the 19th century to reproduce Gothic forms (such as pointed arches), attempts he had helped inspire, were not enough to make these buildings expressions of what Ruskin saw as true Gothic feeling, faith, and organicism.

For Ruskin, the Gothic style in architecture embodied the same moral truths he sought to promote in the visual arts. It expressed the 'meaning' of architecture—as a combination of the values of strength, solidity and aspiration—all written, as it were, in stone. For Ruskin, creating true Gothic architecture involved the whole community, and expressed the full range of human emotions, from the sublime effects of soaring spires to the comically ridiculous carved grotesques and gargoyles. Even its crude and "savage" aspects were proof of "the liberty of every workman who struck the stone; a freedom of thought, and rank in scale of being, such as no laws, no charters, no charities can secure." Classical architecture, in contrast, expressed a morally vacuous and repressive standardisation. Ruskin associated Classical values with modern developments, in particular with the demoralising consequences of the Industrial Revolution, resulting in buildings such as The Crystal Palace, which he criticised. Although Ruskin wrote about architecture in many works over the course of his career, his much-anthologised essay "The Nature of Gothic" from the second volume of The Stones of Venice (1853) is widely considered to be one of his most important and evocative discussions of his central argument.

Ruskin's theories indirectly encouraged a revival of Gothic styles, but Ruskin himself was often dissatisfied with the results. He objected that forms of mass-produced faux Gothic did not exemplify his principles, but showed disregard for the true meaning of the style. Even the Oxford University Museum of Natural History, a building designed with Ruskin's collaboration, met with his disapproval. The O'Shea brothers, freehand stone carvers chosen to revive the creative "freedom of thought" of Gothic craftsmen, disappointed him by their lack of reverence for the task.

Ruskin's distaste for oppressive standardisation led to later works in which he attacked laissez-faire capitalism, which he thought was at its root. His ideas provided inspiration for the Arts and Crafts Movement, the founders of the National Trust, the National Art Collections Fund, and the Society for the Protection of Ancient Buildings.

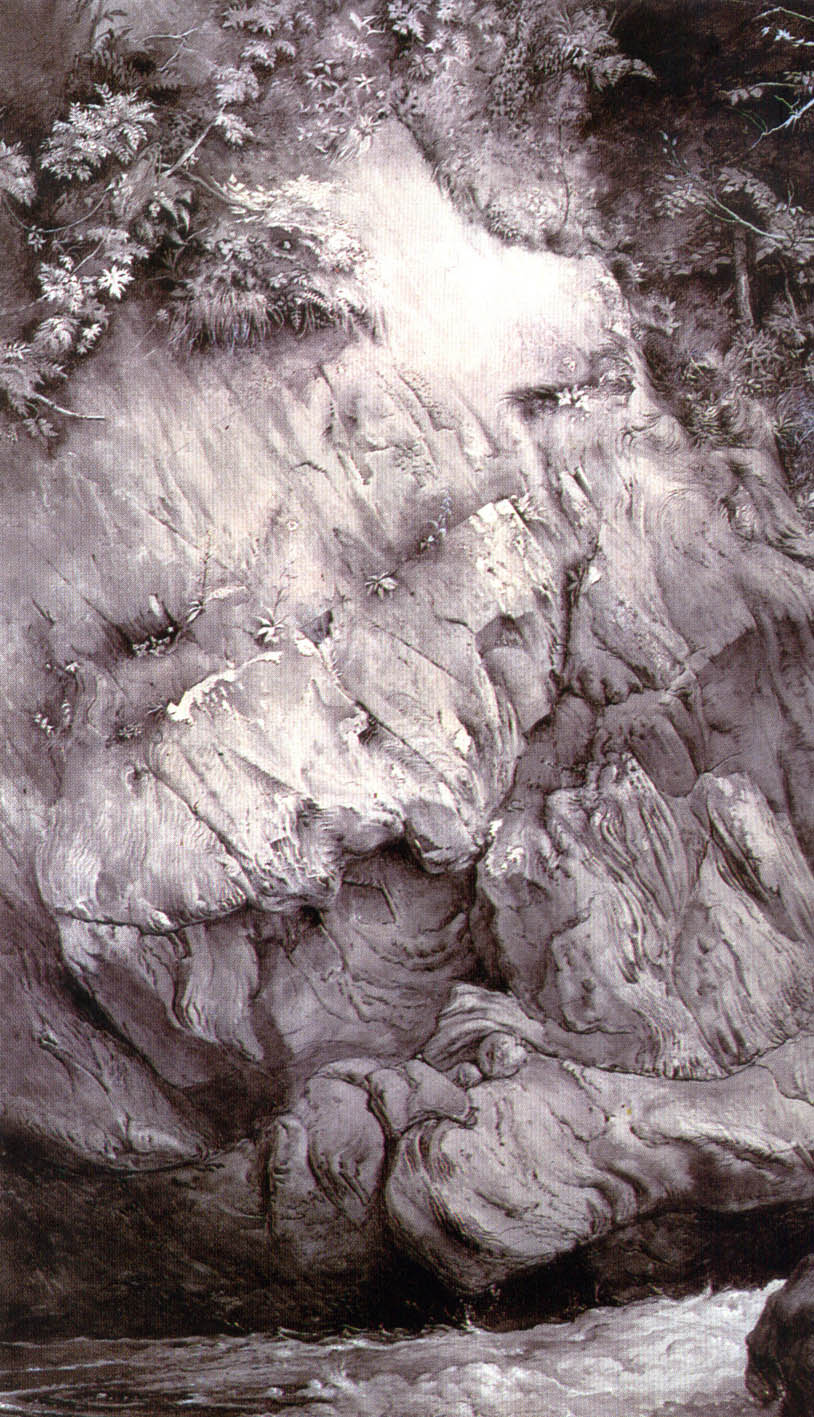
John Ruskin's Study of Gneiss Rock, Glenfinlas, 1853. Pen, ink and wash with Chinese ink on paper, Ashmolean Museum, Oxford, England.

Ruskin's views on art, wrote Kenneth Clark, "cannot be made to form a logical system, and perhaps owe to this fact a part of their value." Ruskin's accounts of art are descriptions of a superior type that conjure images vividly in the mind's eye. Clark neatly summarises the key features of Ruskin's writing on art and architecture:

1. Art is not a matter of taste, but involves the whole man. Whether in making or perceiving a work of art, we bring to bear on it feeling, intellect, morals, knowledge, memory, and every other human capacity, all focused in a flash on a single point. Aesthetic man is a concept as false and dehumanising as economic man.
2. Even the most superior mind and the most powerful imagination must found itself on facts, which must be recognised for what they are. The imagination will often reshape them in a way which the prosaic mind cannot understand; but this recreation will be based on facts, not on formulas or illusions.
3. These facts must be perceived by the senses, or felt; not learnt.
4. The greatest artists and schools of art have believed it their duty to impart vital truths, not only about the facts of vision, but about religion and the conduct of life.
5. Beauty of form is revealed in organisms which have developed perfectly according to their laws of growth, and so give, in his own words, 'the appearance of felicitous fulfilment of function.'
6. This fulfilment of function depends on all parts of an organism cohering and co-operating. This was what he called the 'Law of Help,' one of Ruskin's fundamental beliefs, extending from nature and art to society.
7. Good art is done with enjoyment. The artist must feel that, within certain reasonable limits, he is free, that he is wanted by society, and that the ideas he is asked to express are true and important.
8. Great art is the expression of epochs where people are united by a common faith and a common purpose, accept their laws, believe in their leaders, and take a serious view of human destiny.

=== Historic preservation ===
Ruskin's belief in preservation of ancient buildings had a significant influence on later thinking about the distinction between conservation and restoration. His position at the beginning of his career was very radical and he believed that if no conservation had been done on a building it should be left to die. In The Seven Lamps of Architecture, (1849) Ruskin wrote:

Neither by the public, nor by those who have the care of public monuments, is the true meaning of the word restoration understood. It means the most total destruction which a building can suffer: a destruction out of which no remnants can be gathered: a destruction accompanied with false description of the thing destroyed. Do not let us deceive ourselves in this important matter; it is impossible, as impossible as to raise the dead, to restore anything that has ever been great or beautiful in architecture.

— Seven Lamps ("The Lamp of Memory") c. 6; Cook and Wedderburn 8.242.

For Ruskin, the "age" of a building was crucially significant as an aspect in its preservation: "For, indeed, the greatest glory of a building is not in its stones, not in its gold. Its glory is in its Age, and in that deep sense of voicefulness, of stern watching, of mysterious sympathy, nay, even of approval or condemnation, which we feel in walls that have long been washed by the passing waves of humanity."

It has been thought that he was a strong opponent of his contemporary, Eugène Viollet-le-Duc, who promoted the view that "if no conservation had been done [to] a building it should be restored". In fact, Ruskin never criticised Viollet-le-Duc's restoration work, just the idea of restoration. Ruskin's radical position on restoration became more nuanced at the end of his life, as he wrote in his last book, Praeterita, that "he regretted that no one in England had done the work that Viollet-le-Duc had done in France".

=== Critique of political economy ===
Ruskin wielded a critique of orthodox, 19th-century political economy principally on the grounds that it failed to acknowledge complexities of human desires and motivations (broadly, "social affections"). He began to express such ideas in The Stones of Venice, and increasingly in works of the later 1850s, such as The Political Economy of Art (A Joy for Ever), but he gave them full expression in the influential and at the time of publication, very controversial essays, Unto This Last.

... the art of becoming "rich," in the common sense, is not absolutely nor finally the art of accumulating much money for ourselves, but also of contriving that our neighbours shall have less. In accurate terms, it is "the art of establishing the maximum inequality in our own favour."

— Ruskin, Unto This Last

Nay, but I choose my physician and my clergyman, thus indicating my sense of the quality of their work. By all means, also, choose your bricklayer; that is the proper reward of the good workman, to be "chosen." The natural and right system respecting all labour is, that it should be paid at a fixed rate, but the good workman employed, and the bad workman unemployed. The false, unnatural, and destructive system is when the bad workman is allowed to offer his work at half-price, and either take the place of the good, or force him by his competition to work for an inadequate sum.

— Cook and Wedderburn, 17.V.34 (1860).

At the root of his theory, was Ruskin's dissatisfaction with the role and position of the worker, and especially the artisan or craftsman, in modern industrial capitalist society. Ruskin believed that the economic theories of Adam Smith, expressed in The Wealth of Nations had led, through the division of labour to the alienation of the worker not merely from the process of work itself, but from his fellow workmen and other classes, causing increasing resentment.

Ruskin argued that one remedy would be to pay work at a fixed rate of wages, because human need is consistent and a given quantity of work justly demands a certain return. The best workmen would remain in employment because of the quality of their work (a focus on quality growing out of his writings on art and architecture). The best workmen could not, in a fixed-wage economy, be undercut by an inferior worker or product.

In the preface to Unto This Last (1862), Ruskin recommended that the state should underwrite standards of service and production to guarantee social justice. This included the recommendation of government youth-training schools promoting employment, health, and 'gentleness and justice'; government manufactories and workshops; government schools for the employment at fixed wages of the unemployed, with idlers compelled to toil; and pensions provided for the elderly and the destitute, as a matter of right, received honourably and not in shame. Many of these ideas were later incorporated into the welfare state.

== Controversies ==
=== Sexuality ===
Ruskin's sexuality has been the subject of a great deal of speculation. He was married once, to Effie Gray, whom he met when she was 12 and he was 21, and Gray's family encouraged a match between the two when she had matured. The marriage was annulled after six years owing to non-consummation. Effie, in a letter to her parents, claimed that Ruskin found her "person" repugnant:

He alleged various reasons, hatred of children, religious motives, a desire to preserve my beauty, and finally this last year he told me his true reason… that he had imagined women were quite different to what he saw I was, and that the reason he did not make me his Wife was because he was disgusted with my person the first evening 10th April [1848].

Ruskin told his lawyer during the annulment proceedings:

It may be thought strange that I could abstain from a woman who to most people was so attractive. But though her face was beautiful, her person was not formed to excite passion. On the contrary, there were certain circumstances in her person which completely checked it.

The cause of Ruskin's "disgust" has led to much conjecture. Mary Lutyens speculated that he rejected Effie because he was horrified by the sight of her pubic hair. Lutyens argued that Ruskin must have known the female form only through Greek statues and paintings of nudes which lacked pubic hair. However, Peter Fuller wrote, "It has been said that he was frightened on the wedding night by the sight of his wife's pubic hair; more probably, he was perturbed by her menstrual blood." Ruskin's biographers Tim Hilton and John Batchelor also took the view that menstruation was the more likely explanation, though Batchelor also suggests that body-odour may have been the problem. There is no evidence to support any of these theories. William Ewart Gladstone said to his daughter Mary, "should you ever hear anyone blame Millais or his wife, or Mr. Ruskin [for the breakdown of the marriage], remember that there is no fault; there was misfortune, even tragedy. All three were perfectly blameless." Ruskins' marriage is the subject of a book by Robert Brownell.

Ruskin's later relationship with Rose La Touche began on 3 January 1858, when she was 10 years old and he was about to turn 39. He was her private art tutor, and the two maintained an educational relationship through correspondence until she was 18. Around that time he asked her to marry him. However, Rose's parents forbade it, after learning about his first marriage. Ruskin repeated his marriage proposal when Rose became 21, and legally free to decide for herself. She was willing to marry if the union would remain unconsummated, because her doctors had told her she was unfit for marriage; but Ruskin declined to enter another such marriage for fear of its effect on his reputation.

Ruskin is not known to have had any sexually intimate relationships. During an episode of mental derangement after Rose died, he wrote a letter in which he insisted that Rose's spirit had instructed him to marry a girl who was visiting him at the time. It is also true that in letters from Ruskin to Kate Greenaway he asked her to draw her "girlies" (as he called her child figures) without clothing:

Will you – (it's all for your own good – !) make her stand up and then draw her for me without a cap – and, without her shoes, – (because of the heels) and without her mittens, and without her – frock and frills? And let me see exactly how tall she is – and – how – round. It will be so good of and for you – And to and for me.

In a letter to his physician John Simon on 15 May 1886, Ruskin wrote:

I like my girls from ten to sixteen—allowing of 17 or 18 as long as they're not in love with anybody but me.—I've got some darlings of 8—12—14—just now, and my Pigwiggina here—12—who fetches my wood and is learning to play my bells.

Ruskin's biographers disagree about the allegation of "paedophilia". Tim Hilton, in his two-volume biography, asserts that Ruskin "was a paedophile", alluding by way of explanation to a sensual description by Ruskin of a half-naked girl he saw in Italy and quoting Ruskin's own statements about his liking for young girls, while John Batchelor argues that the term is inappropriate because Ruskin's behaviour does not "fit the profile". Others point to a definite pattern of "nympholeptic" behaviour with regard to his interactions with girls at a Winnington school. However, there is no evidence that Ruskin ever engaged in any sexual activity with anyone at all. According to one interpretation, what Ruskin valued most in pre-pubescent girls was their innocence; the fact that they were not (yet) fully sexually developed. However, James L. Spates describes Ruskin's erotic life as simply "idiosyncratic" and concludes that he "was physically and emotionally normal". The age of consent in the United Kingdom was 12 for females until 1875, 13 between 1875 and 1885, and 16 from 1885 onwards.

=== Turner's erotic drawings ===
Until 2005, biographies of both J. M. W. Turner and Ruskin had claimed that in 1858 Ruskin burned bundles of erotic paintings and drawings by Turner to protect Turner's posthumous reputation. Ruskin's friend Ralph Nicholson Wornum, who was Keeper of the National Gallery, was said to have colluded in the alleged destruction of Turner's works. In 2005, these works, which form part of the Turner Bequest held at Tate Britain, were re-appraised by Turner Curator Ian Warrell, who concluded that Ruskin and Wornum had not destroyed them.

=== Common law of business balance ===
Ruskin was not a fan of buying low and selling high. In the "Veins of Wealth" section of Unto This Last, he wrote: "So far as I know, there is not in history record of anything so disgraceful to the human intellect as the modern idea that the commercial text, 'Buy in the cheapest market and sell in the dearest,' represents, or under any circumstances could represent, an available principle of national economy." Perhaps due to such passages, Ruskin is frequently identified as the originator of the "common law of business balance"—a statement about the relationships of price and quality as they pertain to manufactured goods, and often summarised as: "The common law of business balance prohibits paying a little and getting a lot." This is the core of a longer statement usually attributed to Ruskin, although Ruskin's authorship is disputed among Ruskin scholars. Fred Shapiro maintains that the statement does not appear anywhere in Ruskin's works, and George Landow is likewise sceptical of the claim of Ruskin's authorship. In a posting of the Ruskin Library News, a blog associated with the Ruskin Library (a major collection of Ruskiniana located at Lancaster University), an anonymous library staff member briefly mentions the statement and its widespread use, saying that, "This is one of many quotations ascribed to Ruskin, without there being any trace of them in his writings – although someone, somewhere, thought they sounded like Ruskin." In an issue of the journal Heat Transfer Engineering, Kenneth Bell quotes the statement and mentions that it has been attributed to Ruskin. While Bell believes in the veracity of its content, he adds that the statement does not appear in Ruskin's published works.

Early in the 20th century, this statement appeared—without any authorship attribution—in magazine advertisements, in a business catalogue, in student publications, and, occasionally, in editorial columns. Later in the 20th century, however, magazine advertisements, student publications, business books, technical publications, scholarly journals, and business catalogues often included the statement with attribution to Ruskin.

In the 21st century, and based upon the statement's applicability of the issues of quality and price, the statement continues to be used and attributed to Ruskin—despite the questionable nature of the attribution.

For many years, various Baskin-Robbins ice cream parlours prominently displayed a section of the statement in framed signs: "There is hardly anything in the world that someone cannot make a little worse and sell a little cheaper, and the people who consider price alone are that man's lawful prey." The signs listed Ruskin as the author of the statement, but the signs gave no information on where or when Ruskin was supposed to have written, spoken, or published the statement. Due to the statement's widespread use as a promotional slogan, and despite questions of Ruskin's authorship, it is likely that many people who are otherwise unfamiliar with Ruskin now associate him with this statement.

== Definitions ==
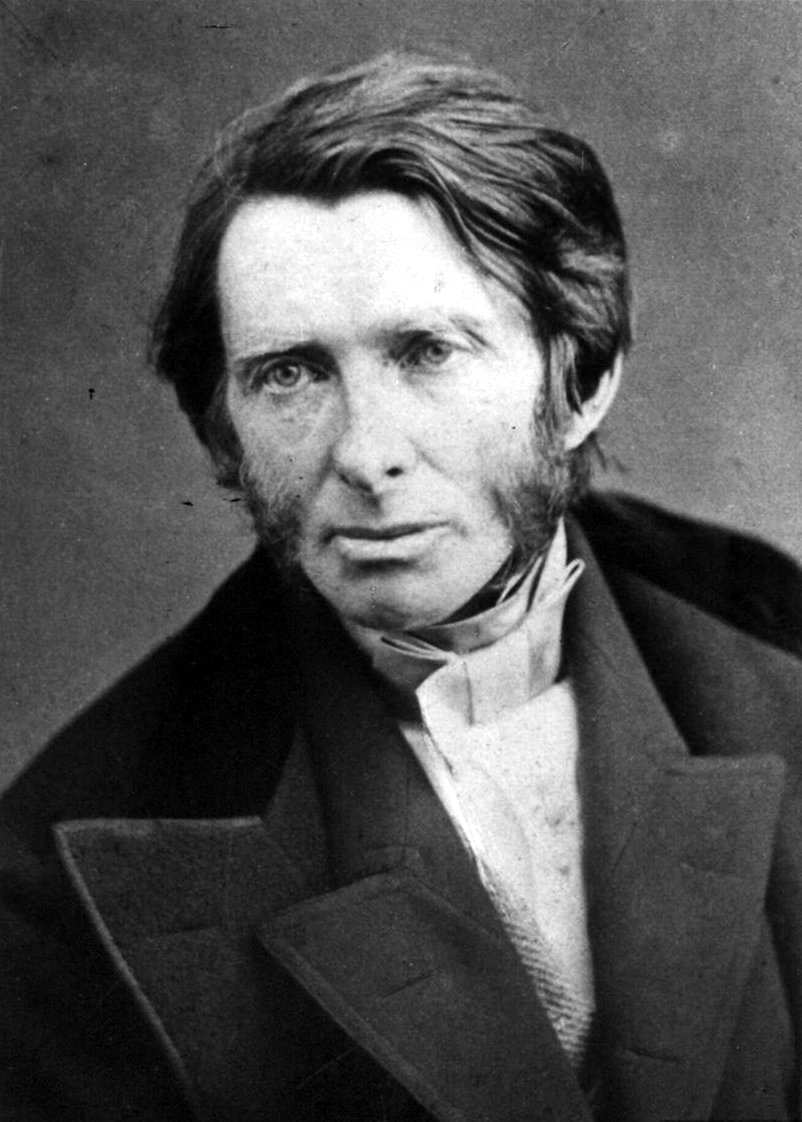
John Ruskin in the 1850s

The OED credits Ruskin with the first quotation in 152 separate entries. Some include:

- Pathetic fallacy: Ruskin coined this term in Modern Painters III (1856) to describe the ascription of human emotions to inanimate objects and impersonal natural forces, as in "Nature must be gladsome when I was so happy" (Charlotte Brontë, Jane Eyre).
- Fors Clavigera: Ruskin gave this title to a series of letters he wrote "to the workmen and labourers of Great Britain" (1871–84). The name was intended to signify three great powers that fashion human destiny, as Ruskin explained at length in Letter 2 (February 1871). These were: force, symbolised by the club (clava) of Hercules; Fortitude, symbolised by the key (clavis) of Ulysses; and Fortune, symbolised by the nail (clavus) of Lycurgus. These three powers (the "fors") together represent human talents and abilities to choose the right moment and then to strike with energy. The concept is derived from Shakespeare's phrase "There is a tide in the affairs of men/ Which, taken at the flood, leads on to fortune" (Brutus in Julius Caesar). Ruskin believed that the letters were inspired by the Third Fors: striking out at the right moment.
- Illth: Used by Ruskin as the antithesis of wealth, which he defined as life itself; broadly, where wealth is 'well-being', illth is "ill-being".
- Theoria: Ruskin's 'theoretic' faculty – theoretic, as opposed to aesthetic – enables a vision of the beautiful as intimating a reality deeper than the everyday, at least in terms of the kind of transcendence generally seen as immanent in things of this world. For an example of the influence of Ruskin's concept of theoria, see Peter Fuller.
- Modern Atheism: Ruskin applied this label to "the unfortunate persistence of the clerks in teaching children what they cannot understand and employing young consecrated persons to assert in pulpits what they do not know."
- Excrescence: Ruskin defined an "excrescence" as an outgrowth of the main body of a building that does not harmonise well with the main body. He originally used the term to describe certain Gothic Revival features also for later additions to cathedrals and various other public buildings, especially from the Gothic period.

== Fictional portrayals ==
=== In literature ===
- Ruskin was the inspiration for either the Drawling Master or the Gryphon in Lewis Carroll's Alice's Adventures in Wonderland (1865).
- Ruskin figures as Mr Herbert in The New Republic (1878), a novel by one of his Oxford undergraduates, William Mallock (1849–1923).
- False Dawn (1924), a novella by Edith Wharton, was the first in the 1924 Old New York series, and had the protagonist meet John Ruskin.
- McDonald, Eva (1979). John Ruskin's Wife. Chivers. ISBN 978-0745113005. A novel about the marriage of John Ruskin.
- Peter Hoyle's novel, Brantwood: The Story of an Obsession (1986), ISBN 9780856356377, is about two cousins who pursue their interest in Ruskin to his Coniston home.
- Morazzoni, Marta (1995). The Invention of Truth. Ecco Pr. ISBN 978-0880013765. A novel in which Ruskin makes his last visit to Amiens cathedral in 1879.
- Donoghue, Emma (2002). The Woman Who Gave Birth to Rabbits. Virago. ISBN 978-1860499548. A collection of short stories that includes Come, Gentle Night, about Ruskin and Effie's wedding night.
- Manly Pursuits (1999), Ruskin and the Hinksey diggings form the backdrop to Ann Harries' novel.
- Sesame and Roses (2007), a short story by Grace Andreacchi that explores Ruskin's twin obsessions with Venice and Rose La Touche.
- Benjamin, Melanie (2010), Alice I Have Been. ISBN 0385344139. A fictionalized account of the life of Alice Liddell Hargreaves, the inspiration for Lewis Carroll's Alice's Adventures in Wonderland and Through the Looking Glass.
- Light, Descending (2014), is a biographical novel about John Ruskin by Octavia Randolph.

=== In other media ===
- The Love of John Ruskin (1912), a silent movie about Ruskin, Effie and Millais.
- Dante's Inferno (1967), Ken Russell's biopic for television of Rossetti, in which Ruskin is played by Clive Goodwin
- The Love School (1975), a BBC TV series about the Pre-Raphaelites, starring David Collings (Ruskin), Anne Kidd (Effie), Peter Egan (Millais).
- Dear Countess (1983), a radio play by Elizabeth Morgan, with Derek Jacobi (Ruskin), Bridget McCann (Gray), Timothy West (Old Mr Ruskin) Michael Fenner (Millais). The author played Ruskin's mother.
- The Passion of John Ruskin (1994), a film directed by Alex Chapple.
- Parrots and Owls (1994), a radio play by John Purser about Ruskin's attempt to revive Gothic architecture and his connection to the O'Shea brothers, with Michael Pennington in the role of Ruskin.
- Modern Painters (1995), an opera about Ruskin by David Lang.
- The Countess (1995), a play written by Gregory Murphy, dealing with Ruskin's marriage.
- The Order of Release (1998), a radio play by Robin Brooks about Ruskin (Bob Peck), Effie (Sharon Small) and Millais (David Tennant).
- Mrs Ruskin (2003), a play by Kim Morrissey dealing with Ruskin's marriage.
- Desperate Romantics (2009), a six-part BBC drama serial about the Pre-Raphaelite Brotherhood. Ruskin is played by Tom Hollander.
- Mr. Turner (2014), a biopic of J. M. W. Turner directed by Mike Leigh with Ruskin portrayed by Joshua McGuire.
- Effie Gray (2014), a biopic about the Ruskin–Gray–Millais love triangle, written by Emma Thompson, directed by Richard Laxton, and featuring Greg Wise (Ruskin), Dakota Fanning (Gray) and Tom Sturridge (Millais).
- Light, Descending (2014), is a biographical novel about John Ruskin by Octavia Randolph.
- Many Beautiful Things (2015), a film in which he is voiced by John Rhys-Davies and portrayed by Jerry Eisley.

== Collections ==
Ruskin's works can be found in many institutions including the following:

- The Ashmolean Museum, Oxford, holds over 1450 artworks assembled by Ruskin for use in teaching at the drawing school he founded;
- The Baldwin Library of Historical Children's Literature at the University of Florida holds over 160 books which belonged to Ruskin;
- Birmingham Museums hold the John Ruskin Collection;
- The Bodleian Library, University of Oxford holds a collection of transcripts of letters and papers of Ruskin made for E.T. Cook and A.D.O. Wedderburn, editors of The works of Ruskin (London & New York, 1903-1912);
- Brantwood house at Coniston Water, where Ruskin once lived;
- The Guild of St George, Sheffield, was founded by Ruskin in 1871 and its main collection of material was donated by him;
- Gladstone's Library hold letters from Ruskin to his former Oxford tutor Reverend Walter Lucas Brown;
- Hull University Archives hold 65 letters to John Ruskin;
- The John Rylands Library at the University of Manchester holds the John Ruskin Papers (which contain over 2000 items, primarily correspondence, relating to Ruskin's life) and the John Ruskin Printed Works collection (which contains over 450 items, mostly first editions, of Ruskin's work);
- The National Portrait Gallery, London, holds 80 artworks of Ruskin;
- Newcastle University Special Collections & Archives holds letters from and about Ruskin as part of the Walter Calverley Trevelyan Archive;
- The Ruskin Institute at Lancaster University contains large amounts paintings and drawings, books and manuscripts, and prints and photographs relating to Ruskin. The collection was formed by MP and educator John Howard Whitehouse.
- The Ruskin Museum in Coniston, established in 1901 by Ruskin's secretary W.G. Collingwood;
- University College London holds letters from Ruskin to his former Oxford tutor Reverend Walter Lucas Brown.

== Gallery ==
=== Paintings ===
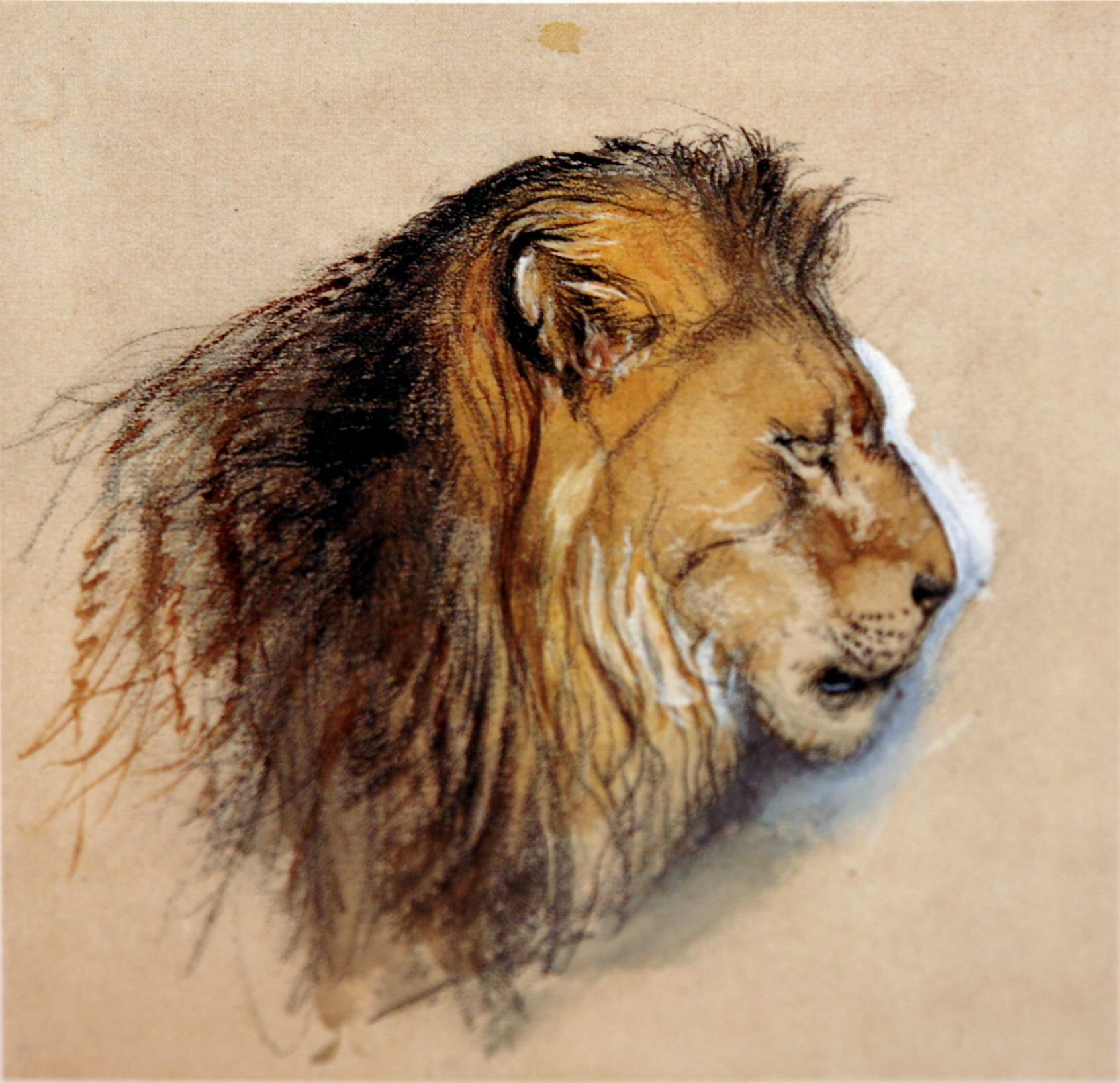
Lion's profile

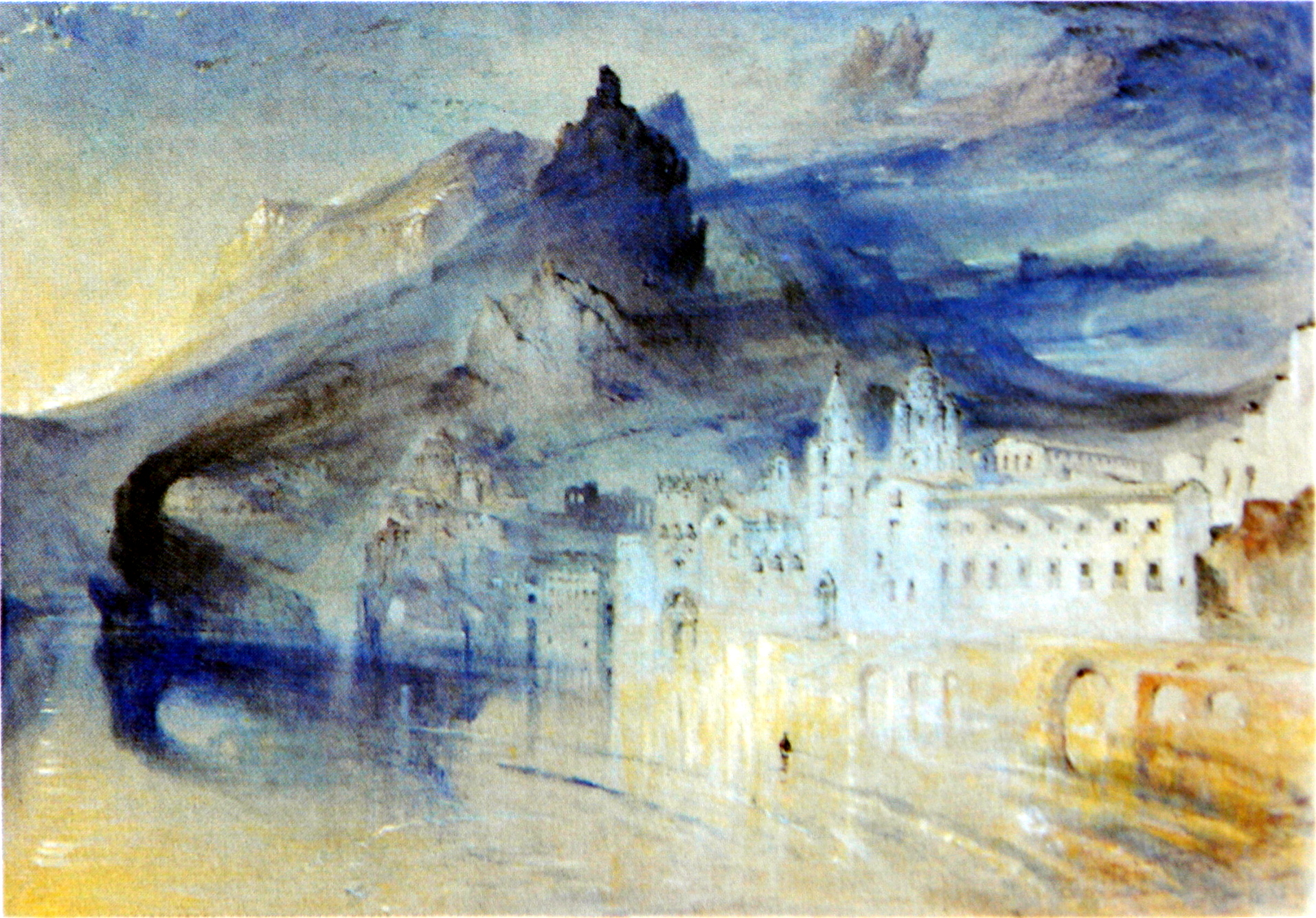
View of Amalfi

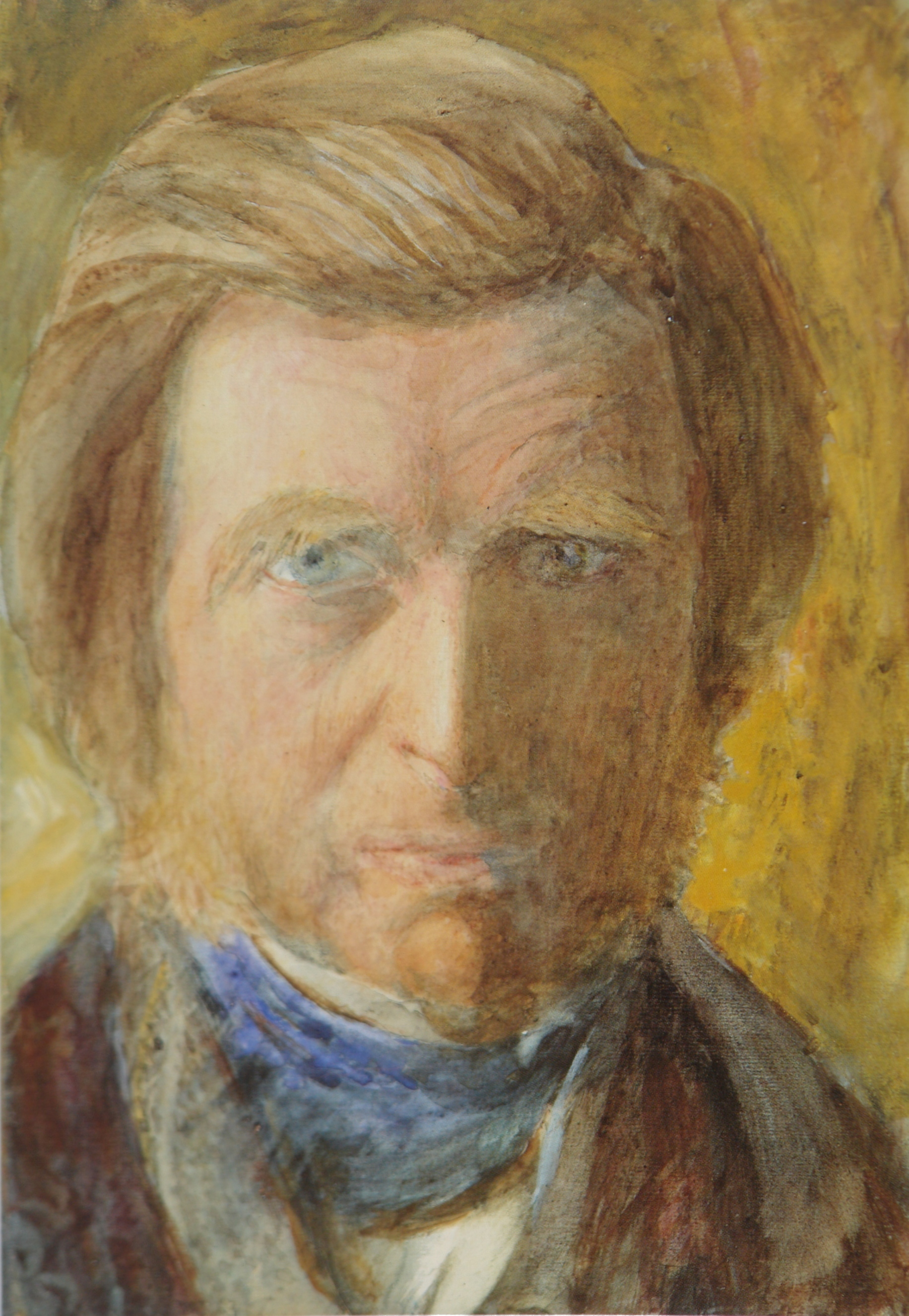
Self Portrait with Blue Neckcloth

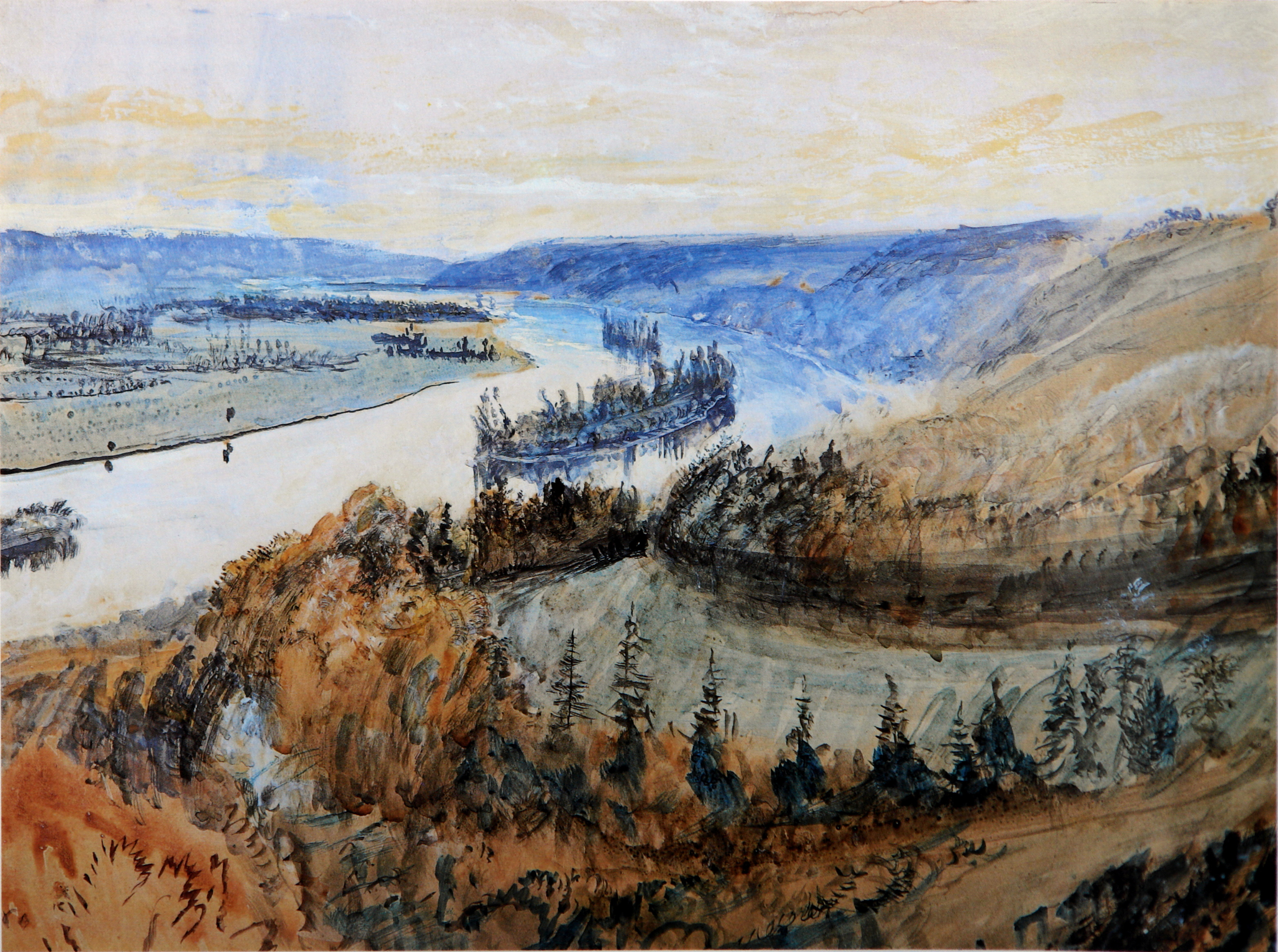
River Seine and its Islands
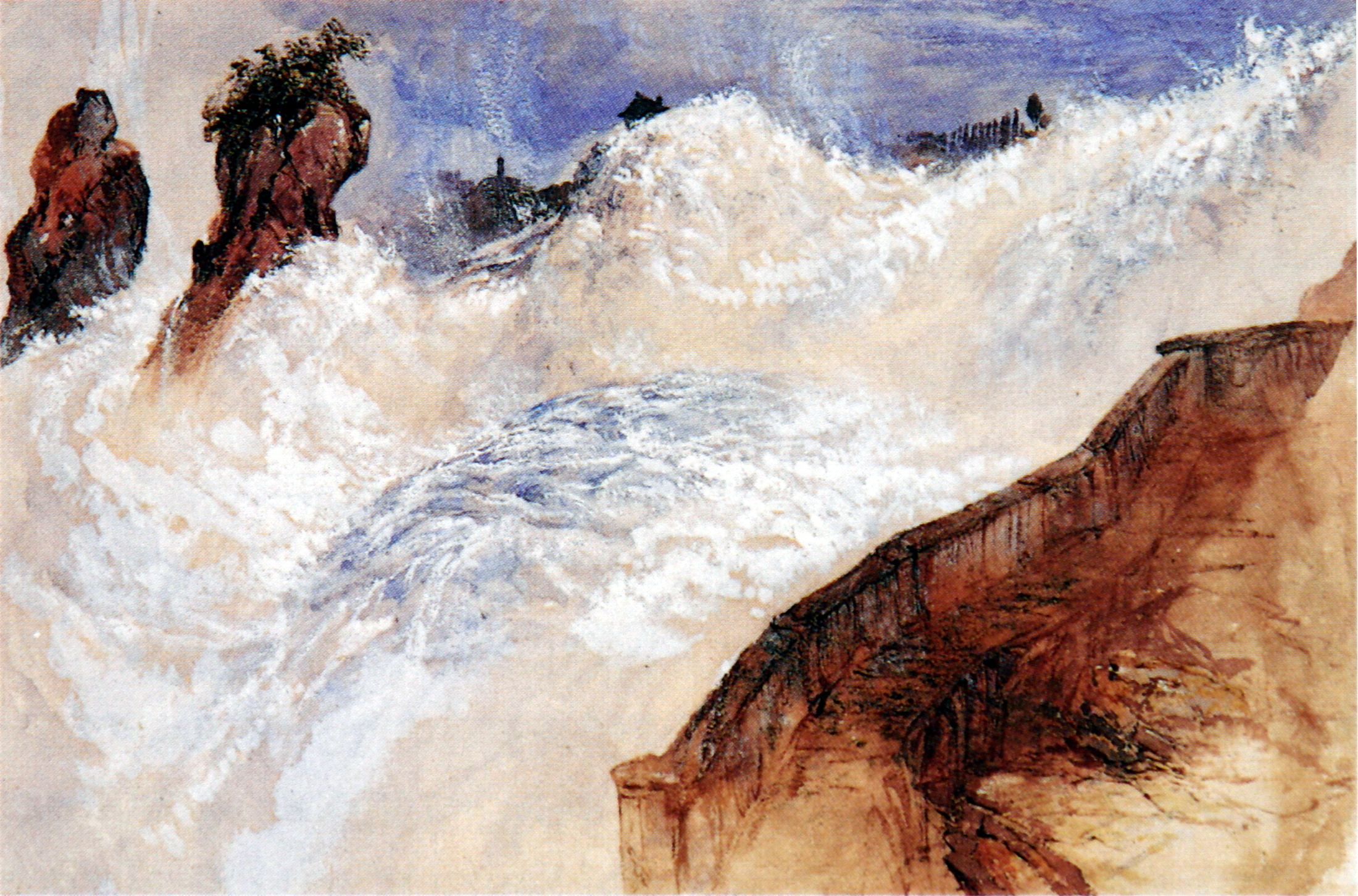
Falls of Schaffhausen

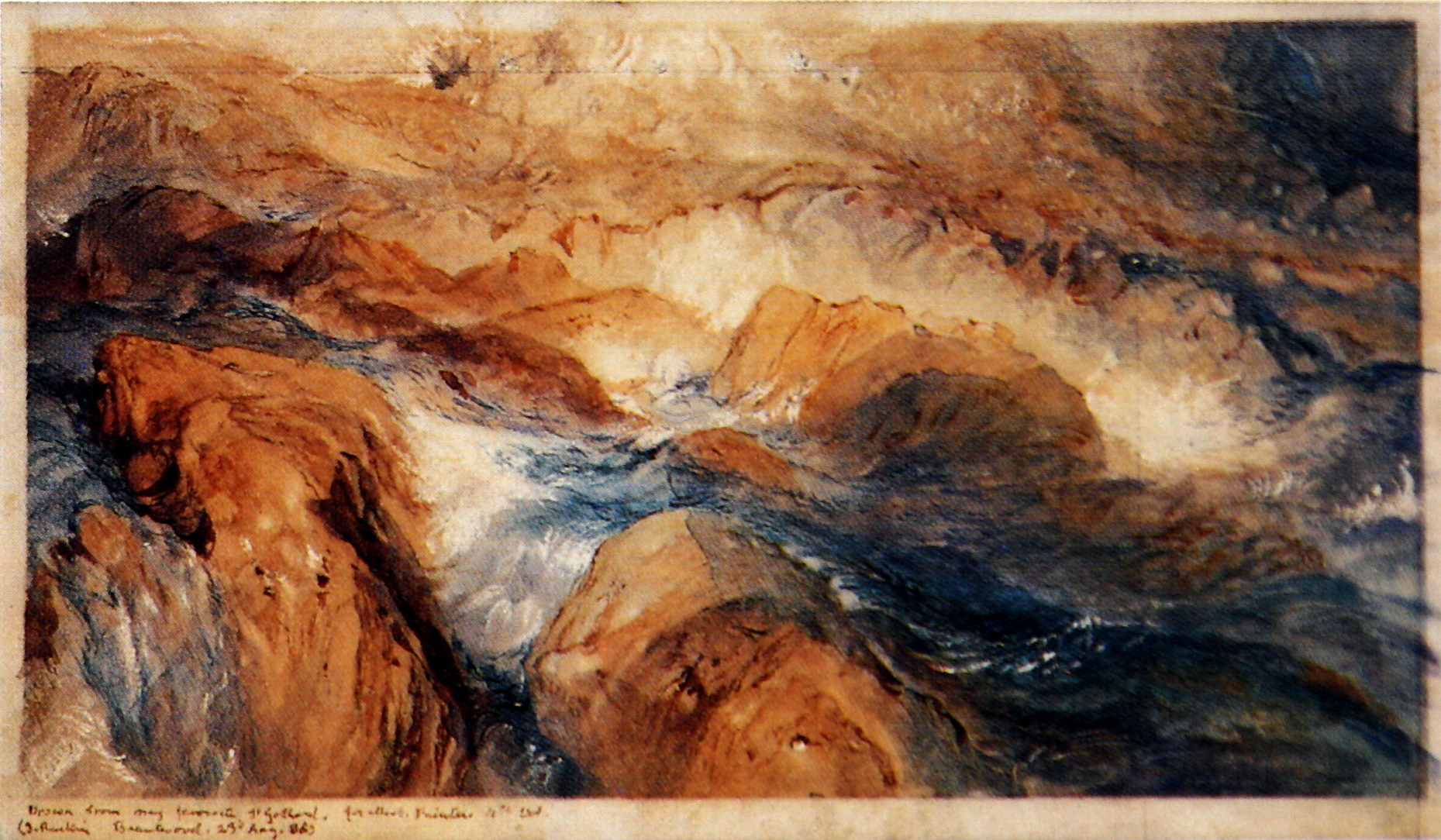
Rocks in Unrest

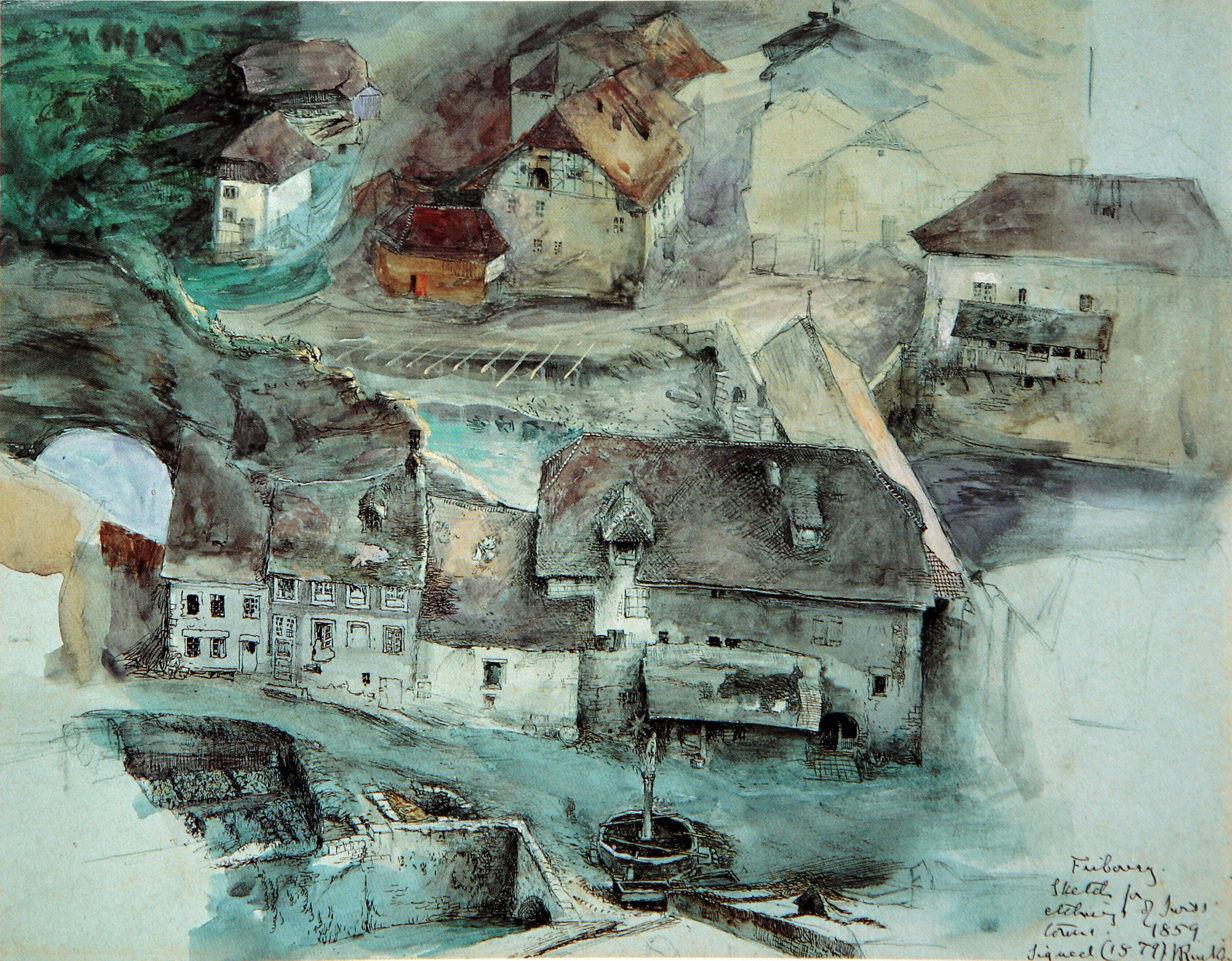
Fribourg Suisse

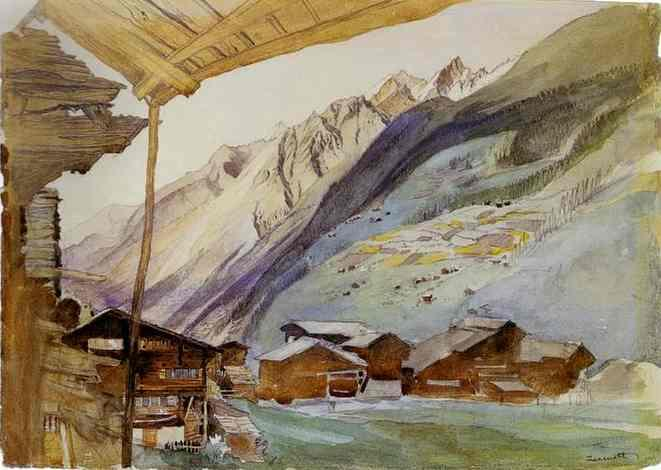
Zermatt

=== Drawings ===
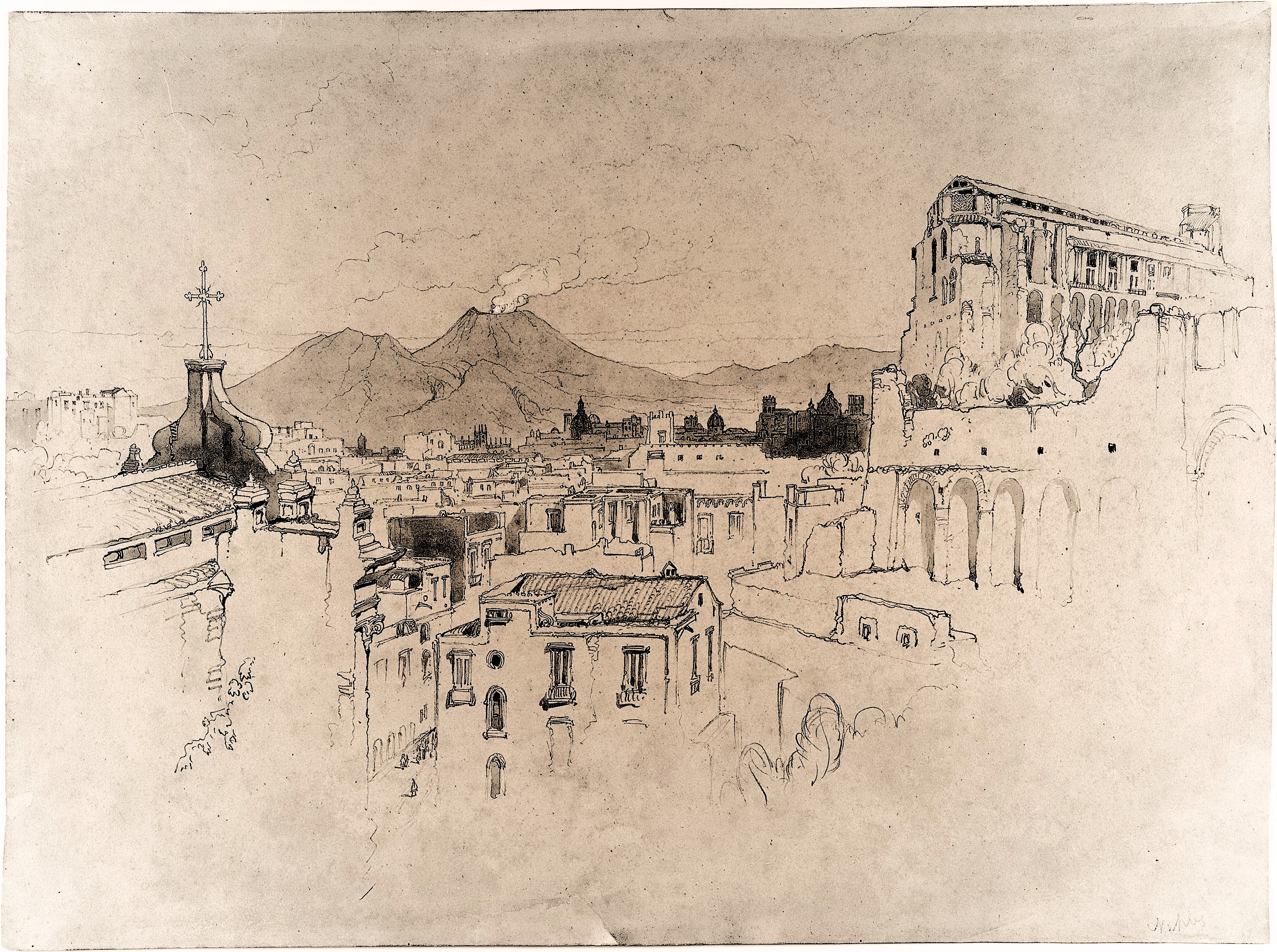
Naples

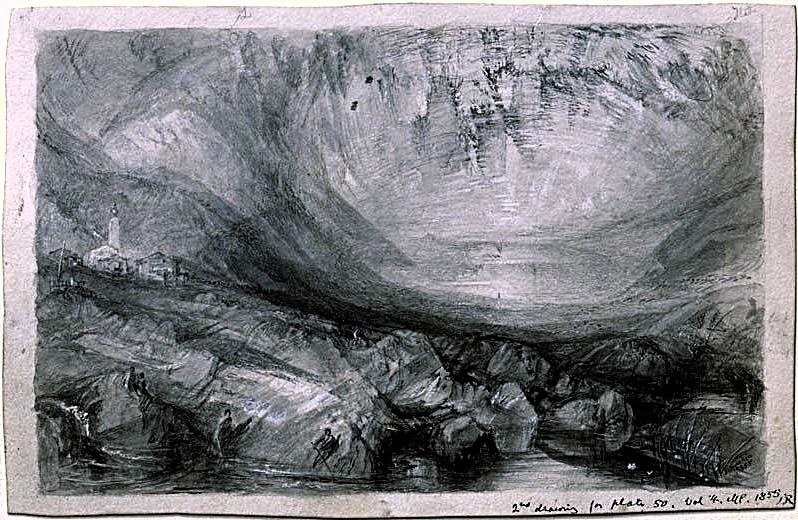
Sunset seen from Goldau (after J. M. W. Turner)

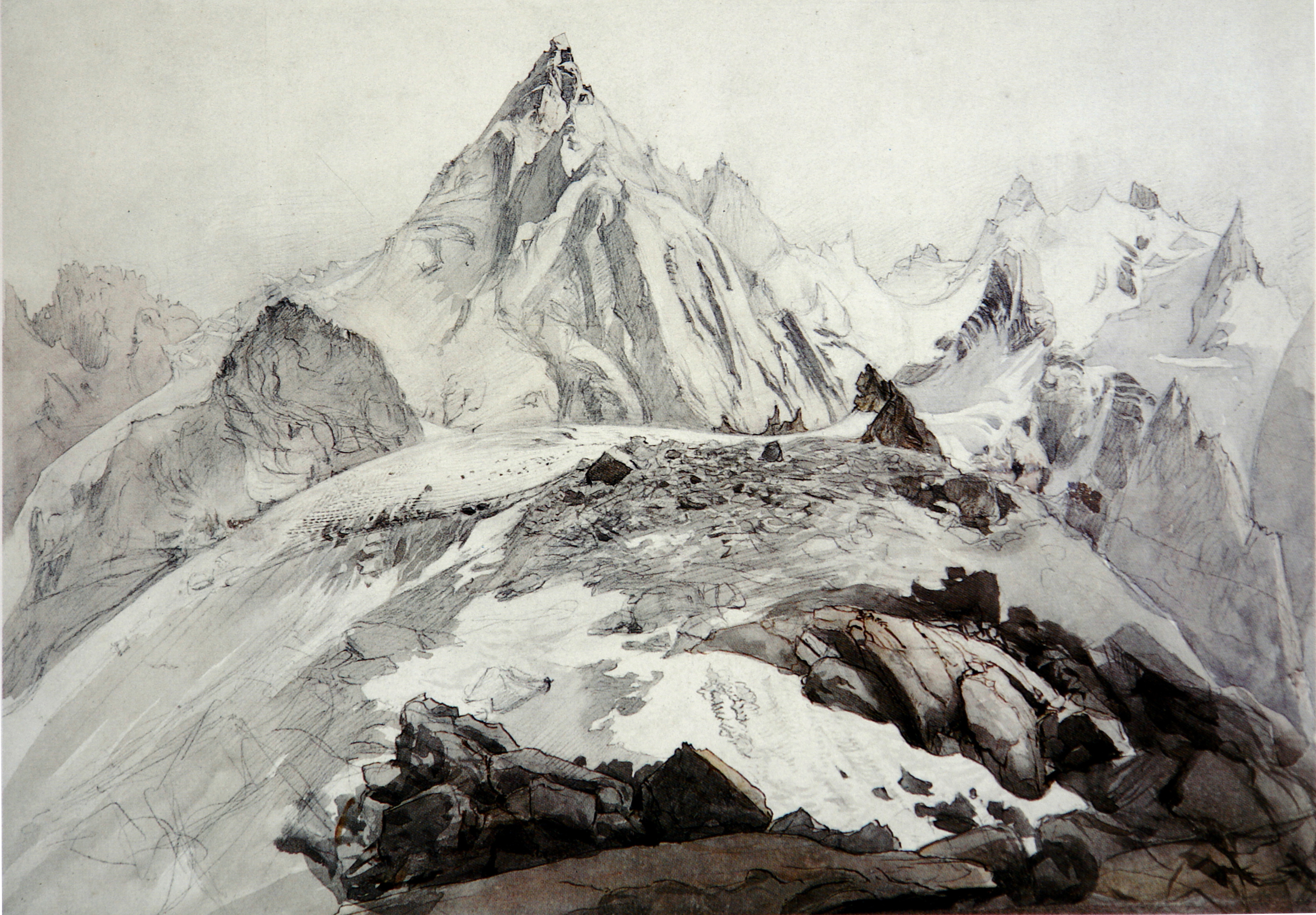
Aiguille de Blaitière

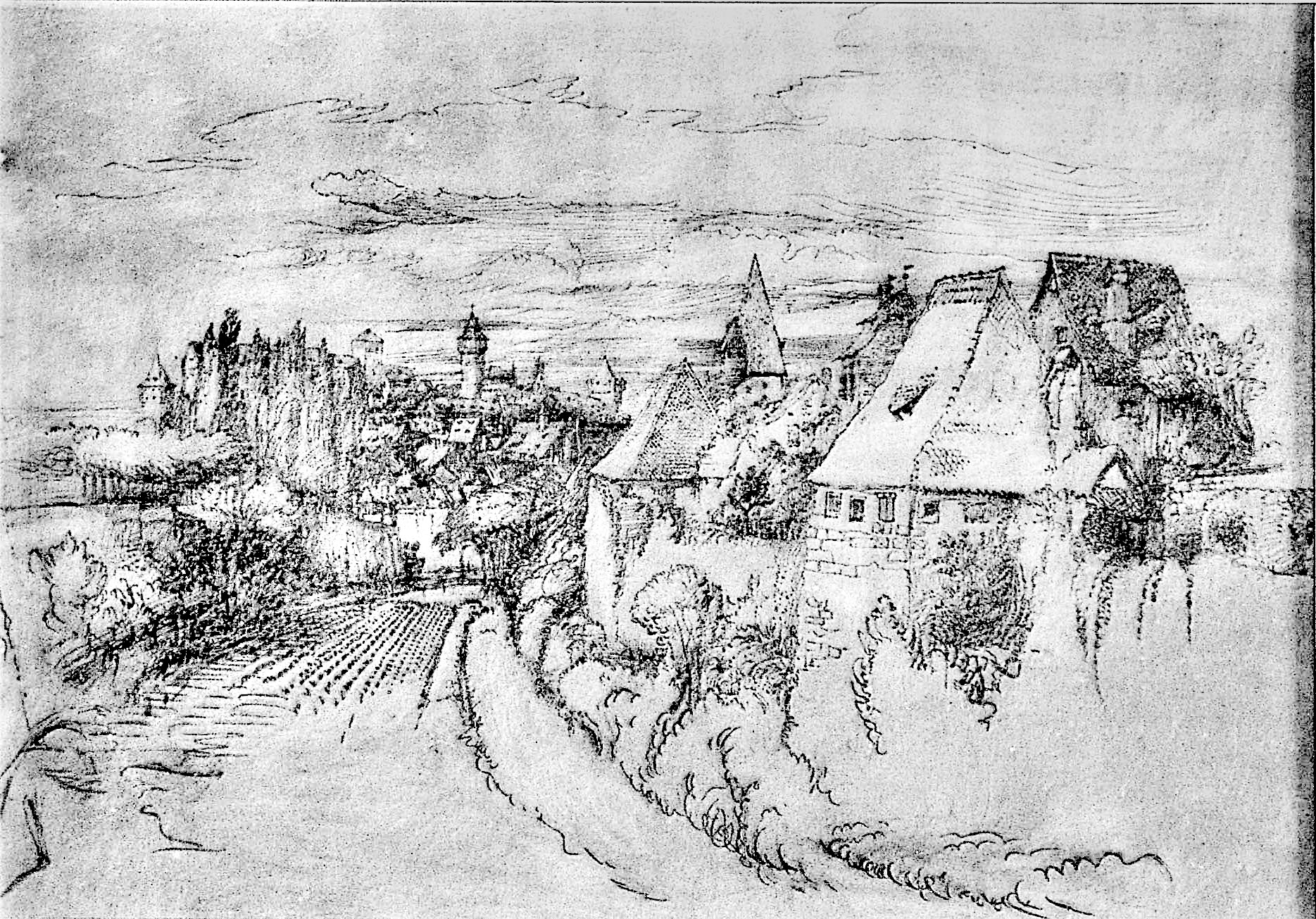
Lauffenbourg

== Bibliography ==
The standard, or Library Edition of Ruskin's Works is Cook, E. T.; Wedderburn, Alexander (eds.). The Works of John Ruskin. (39 vols.). George Allen, 1903–12. It is sometimes called simply Cook and Wedderburn.

=== Works by Ruskin ===
NB. The column marked LE gives the volume number in which the work appears in the Library Edition of The Works of John Ruskin, ed. E. T. Cook and Alexander Wedderburn (39 vols) (London: George Allen, 1903–1912).

Year	Title	LE	Notes
1850	Poems	02	written 1835–1846
1837– 1838	The Poetry of Architecture	01	serialised The Architectural Magazine 1837–38; authorised book, 1893)
1894	Letters to a College Friend	01	written 1840–1845
1850	The King of the Golden River, or the Black Brothers. A Legend of Stiria	01	written 1841
1843– 1860	Modern Painters (5 vols)	03– 07	
1843	Modern Painters 1:Of General Principles and of Truth	03	Parts I and II
1846	Modern Painters 2: Of the Imaginative and Theoretic Faculties	04	Part III
1856	Modern Painters 3: Of Many Things	05	Part IV
1856	Modern Painters 4: Mountain Beauty	06	Part V
1860	Modern Painters 5: Of Leaf Beauty, Of Cloud Beauty, Of Ideas of Relation (1) Of Invention Formal, Of Ideas of Relation (2) Of Invention Spiritual	07	Parts VI–IX
1849	The Seven Lamps of Architecture	08	
1851– 1853	The Stones of Venice (3 vols)	09– 11	Abridged audiobook by Robert Hewison
1851	The Stones of Venice 1: The Foundations	09	
1853	The Stones of Venice 2: The Sea–Stories	10	with chapter "The Nature of Gothic"
1853	The Stones of Venice 3: The Fall	11	
1851	Notes on the Construction of Sheepfolds	12	
1851	Pre-Raphaelitism	12	
1851, 1854	Letters to the Times on the Pre-Raphaelite Artists	12	
1854	Lectures on Architecture and Painting (Edinburgh, 1853)	12	
1855– 1859, 1875	Academy Notes	14	reviews of the June Royal Academy exhibitions
1856	The Harbours of England	13	
1857	The Elements of Drawing, in Three Letters to Beginners	15	
1857, 1880	’A Joy Forever' and Its Price in the Market: being the substance (with additions) of two lectures on The Political Economy of Art	16	
1859	The Two Paths: being Lectures on Art, and Its Application to Decoration and Manufacture, Delivered in 1858–9	16	
1859	The Elements of Perspective, Arranged for the Use of Schools and Intended to be Read in Connection with the First Three Books of Euclid	15	
1862	Unto This Last: Four Essays on the First Principles of Political Economy '	17	serialised Cornhill Magazine 1860
1872	Munera Pulveris: Six Essays on the Elements of Political Economy	17	serialised Fraser's Magazine
1864	The Cestus of Aglaia	19	serialised Art Journal 1864, incorporated (revised) in On the Old Road (1882)
1865	Sesame and Lilies: Two Lectures delivered at Manchester in 1864	18	i.e., "Of Queens' Gardens" and "Of Kings' Treasuries" (plus, edn of 1871, "The Mystery of Life and Its Arts")
1866	The Ethics of the Dust: Ten Lectures to Little Housewives on the Elements of Crystallisation	18	lectures given to the girls at Winnington Hall
1866	The Crown of Wild Olive: Three Lectures on Work, Traffic and War	18	in a later edition, a fourth lecture (delivered 1869), "The Future of England", was added
1867	Time and Tide, by Weare and Tyne: Twenty-five Letters to a Working Man of Sunderland on the Laws of Work	17	letters to Thomas Dixon
1869	The Queen of the Air: A Study of the Greek Myths of Cloud and Storm	19	
1870	Lectures on Art, Delivered before the University of Oxford in Hilary term, 1870	20	
1872	Aratra Pentelici: Six Lectures on the Elements of Sculpture Given before the University of Oxford in Michaelmas term, 1870	20	
1898	Lectures on Landscape, Delivered at Oxford in [Lent term| Lent Term], 1871	22	
1871– 1884	Fors Clavigera: Letters to the Workmen and Labourers of Great Britain	27– 29	originally collected in 8 vols., vols. 1–7 covering annually 1871–1877, and vol. 8, Letters 85–96, covering 1878–84
1871– 1873	Fors Clavigera 1: Letters 1–36	27	
1874– 1876	Fors Clavigera 2: Letters 37–72	28	
1877– 1884	Fors Clavigera 3: Letters 73–96 (1877–1884)	29	
1872	The Eagle's Nest: Ten Lectures on the Relation of Natural science to Art, Given before the University of Oxford in Lent term, 1872	22	
1876	Ariadne Florentina': Six Lectures on Wood and Metal Engraving, with Appendix, Given before the University of Oxford, in Michaelmas Term, 1872	22	
1873– 1881	Love's Meinie: Lectures on Greek and English Birds	25	
1874	Val d'Arno: Ten Lectures on the Tuscan Art, directly antecedent to the Florentine Year of Victories, given before the University of Oxford in Michaelmas Term, 1873	23	
1906	The Aesthetic and Mathematic School of Art in Florence: Lectures Given before the University of Oxford in Michaelmas Term, 1874	23	
1875– 1877	Mornings in Florence: Simple Studies of Christian Art, for English Travellers	23	
1875– 1883	Deucalion: Collected Studies of the Lapse of Waves, and Life of Stones	26	
1875– 1886	Proserpina: Studies of Wayside Flowers, While the Air was Yet Pure Among the Alps, and in the Scotland and England Which My Father Knew	25	
1876– 1888	Bibliotheca Pastorum	31– 32	i.e., 'Shepherd's Library', edited by Ruskin
1877– 1878	Laws of Fésole: A Familiar Treatise on the Elementary Principles and Practice of Drawing and Painting as Determined by the Tuscan Masters (arranged for the use of schools)	15	
1877– 1884	St Mark's Rest	24	
1880– 1881	Fiction, Fair and Foul	34	serialised Nineteenth Century 1880–81, incorporated in On the Old Road (1885))
1880– 1885	The Bible of Amiens	33	first part of Our Fathers Have Told Us
1884	The Art of England: Lectures Given in Oxford, During his Second Tenure of the Slade Professorship	33	delivered 1883
1884	The Storm-Cloud of the Nineteenth Century: Two Lectures Delivered at the London Institution, 4 and 11 February 1884	34	
1884– 1885	The Pleasures of England: Lectures Given in Oxford, During his Second Tenure of the Slade Professorship	33	delivered 1884
1885– 1889	Præterita: Outlines of Scenes and Thoughts Perhaps Worthy of Memory in My Past Life (3 vols)	35	
1886, 1887. 1900	Dilecta: Correspondence, Diary Notes, and Extracts from Books, Illustrating 'Praeterita'	35	

=== Selected diaries and letters ===
- The Diaries of John Ruskin eds. Joan Evans and John Howard Whitehouse (Clarendon Press, 1956–1959)
- The Brantwood Diary of John Ruskin ed. Helen Gill Viljoen (Yale University Press, 1971)
- A Tour of the Lakes in Cumbria. John Ruskin's Diary for 1830 eds. Van Akin Burd and James S. Dearden (Scolar, 1990)
- The Winnington Letters: John Ruskin's correspondence with Margaret Alexis Bell and the children at Winnington Hall ed. Van Akin Burd (Harvard University Press, 1969)
- The Ruskin Family Letters: The Correspondence of John James Ruskin, his wife, and their son John, 1801–1843 ed. Van Akin Burd (2 vols.) (Cornell University Press, 1973)
- The Correspondence of John Ruskin and Charles Eliot Norton ed. John Lewis Bradley and Ian Ousby (Cambridge University Press, 1987)
- The Correspondence of Thomas Carlyle and John Ruskin ed. George Allen Cate (Stanford University Press, 1982)
- John Ruskin's Correspondence with Joan Severn: Sense and Nonsense Letters ed. Rachel Dickinson (Legenda, 2008)

=== Selected editions of Ruskin still in print ===
- Praeterita [Ruskin's autobiography] ed. Francis O' Gorman (Oxford University Press, 2012)
- Unto this Last: Four essays on the First Principles of Political Economy intro. Andrew Hill (Pallas Athene, 2010)
- Unto This Last And Other Writings ed. Clive Wilmer (Penguin, 1986)
- Fors Clavigera: Letters to the Workmen and Labourers of Great Britain ed. Dinah Birch (Edinburgh University Press, 1999)
- The Storm-Cloud of the Nineteenth-Century preface by Clive Wilmer and intro. Peter Brimblecombe (Pallas Athene, 2012)
- The Nature of Gothic (Pallas Athene, 2011) [facsimile reprint of Morris's Kelmscott Edition with essays by Robert Hewison and Tony Pinkney]
- Selected Writings ed. Dinah Birch (Oxford University Press, 2009)
- Selected Writings (originally Ruskin Today) ed. Kenneth Clark (Penguin, 1964 and later impressions)
- The Genius of John Ruskin: Selections from his Writings ed. John D. Rosenberg (George Allen and Unwin, 1963)
- Athena: Queen of the Air (Annotated) (originally The Queen of the Air: A Study of the Greek Myths of Cloud and Storm) ed. Na Ding, foreword by Tim Kavi, brief literary bio by Kelli M. Webert (TiLu Press, 2013 electronic book version, paper forthcoming)
- Ruskin on Music ed Mary Augusta Wakefield (Creative Media Partners LLC, 2015)

== See also ==
- Ruskin, Nebraska
- Ruskin's diggers in Ferry Hinksey (1874)
- Ruskin's Ride, a bridleway in Oxford
- Trenton, Missouri, home of the first Ruskin College in the United States
- Charles Augustus Howell
- The English House
- Mount Ruskin
- Great man theory

== Sources ==
- Robert Hewison, "Ruskin, John (1819–1900)", Oxford Dictionary of National Biography (ODNB) Oxford University Press, 2004; online edition.
- Francis O'Gorman (1999), John Ruskin (Pocket Biographies) (Sutton Publishing)
- James S. Dearden (2004), John Ruskin (Shire Publications)
