= Ruskin =

Ruskin may refer to:

== People and fictional characters ==
- Ruskin (surname), a list of people and fictional characters
- Ruskin (given name), a list of people

== Places ==
=== United States ===
- Ruskin, Florida, a census-designated place
- Ruskin, Georgia, an unincorporated community
- Ruskin, Minnesota. an unincorporated community
- Ruskin, Nebraska, a village
- Ruskin Colony, a utopian socialist colony in Dickson County, Tennessee, from 1894 to 1899
- Mount Ruskin, California

=== Elsewhere ===
- Ruskin, British Columbia, Canada, a community
  - Ruskin Dam and Powerhouse
- Ruskin, Iran, a village in Kerman Province

== Education ==
- Anglia Ruskin University, Cambridge, England
- Ruskin College, Oxford, an adult education college named after John Ruskin
- Ruskin School of Art, Oxford University, United Kingdom
- Ruskin Colleges, a group of American colleges named after John Ruskin
- John Ruskin College, a further education college in South Croydon, Greater London
- Ruskin Hall, a residence hall at the University of Pittsburgh and a National Historic Place
- Ruskin High School (disambiguation)
- John Ruskin School, Coniston, Cumbria, England
- The Ruskin, Lancaster, Lancaster University, United Kingdom, an archive, museum and research centre

== Other uses ==
- Ruskin Gallery, Sheffield, England
- Ruskin Galleries, Birmingham, England, a private art gallery from 1925 to 1940
- Ruskin Museum, Coniston, Cumbria, England
- Ruskin Pottery, an English pottery studio in operation between 1898 and 1935
- Ruskin, a 1974 film by Robert Beavers from his cycle My Hand Outstretched to the Winged Distance and Sightless Measure
- Ruskin Drive, a road in Altoona, Pennsylvania, United States

== See also ==
- Ruskin's Ride, a bridleway in Oxford, England
