= Little Manatee River =

River in Florida, United States

Coordinates: 27.7144746°N 82.4653725°W

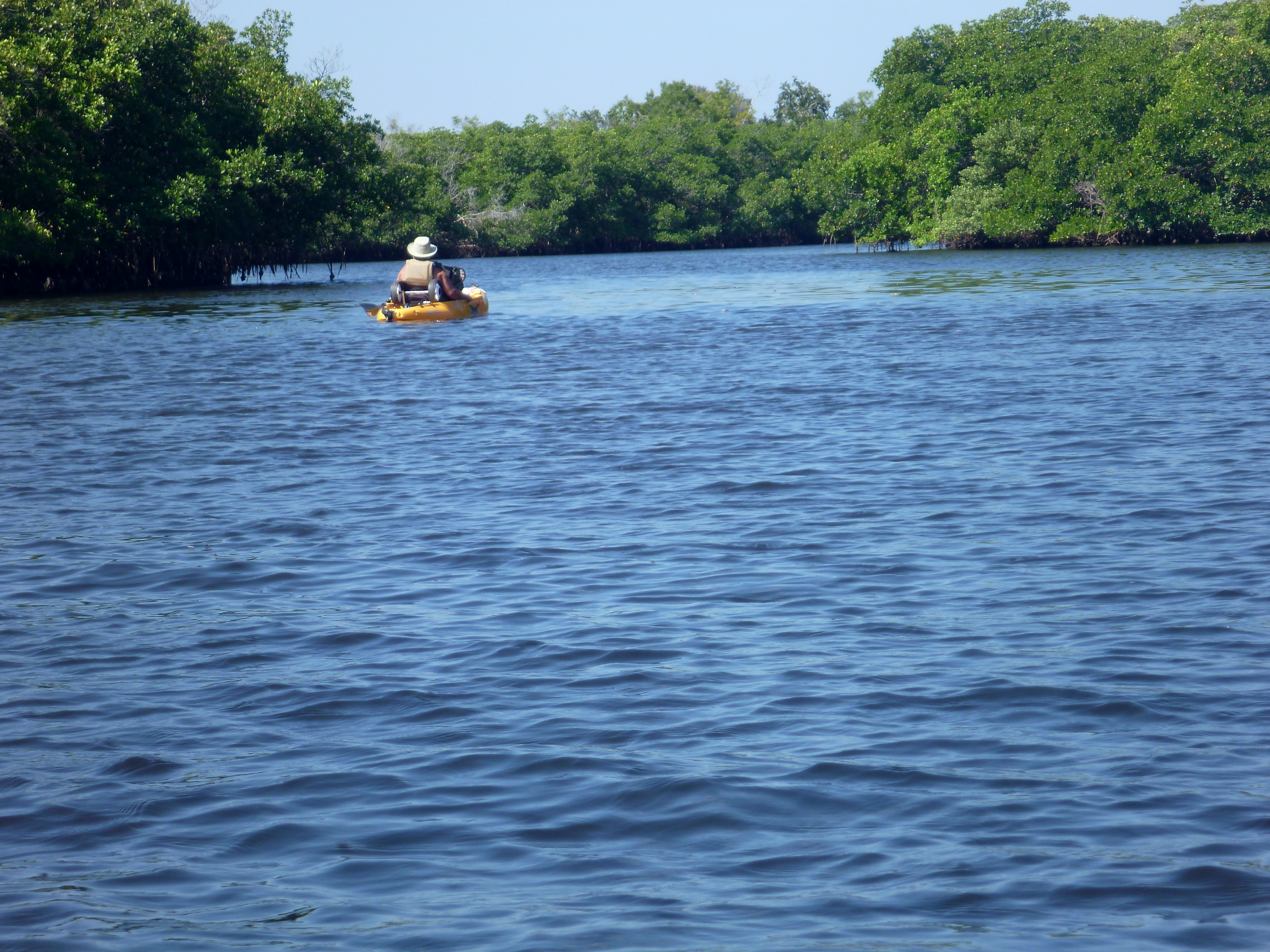
Kayaker on the Little Manatee River

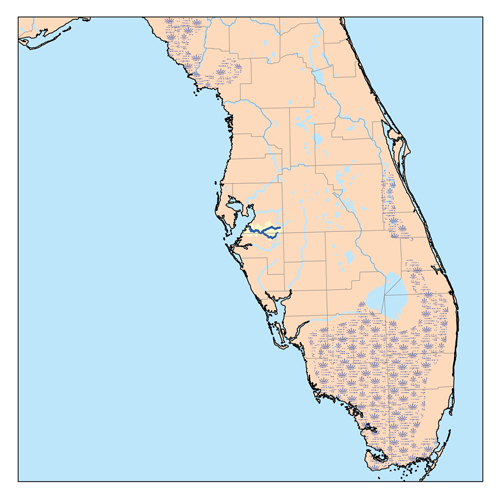
Map of the river (highlighted in dark blue at the center)

The Little Manatee River is a river flowing into Tampa Bay in the west central peninsula of Florida.

== Course ==
The Little Manatee River flows east to west across southern Hillsborough County, dipping briefly into Manatee County. Most of the river's watershed is in Hillsborough County, but the South Fork of the river drains northeastern Manatee County, and Alderman Creek drains a small area in southwestern Polk County. The river begins east of Fort Lonesome, and reaches Tampa Bay after passing through Wimauma, Sun City Center, and Ruskin. The river is 41 miles (66 km) long and the watershed covers 243 square miles (630 km^{2}). The lower 5 miles (8.0 km) of the river is tidal. The mean flow rate of the river is 4.9 cubic metres (170 cu ft) per second. The river has been designated an Outstanding Florida Water by the Florida Department of Environmental Protection. Parts of the river flow through the Little Manatee River State Park and the Cockroach Bay Aquatic Preserve. The Hillsborough County Little Manatee River Corridor Preserve protects more than 8,000 acres (3,200 ha) along the upper reaches of the river.

== History ==
Archaeological sites near tributaries of the Little Manatee River have mainly yielded artifacts of the Middle Archaic (5000–3000 BCE) and Late Weeden Island (500–1000) periods. The Little Manatee River was in the Safety Harbor culture (900–1700) area. A large shell mound near the mouth of the river, called the Bahia Beach Mound, may have been a temple mound from that period. The town of Uzita, the first inhabited place in Florida visited by the Hernando de Soto expedition, is believed to have been located near the Little Manatee River.

An "African-inspired mahogany drum found in the bank of the Little Manatee River. Courtesy of the Florida Museum of Natural History." "The drum was found in 1967. Now stored at the Florida Museum of Natural History the artifact, cataloged as E183, has received only minor attention."

Ruskin was founded as a socialist utopian colony in 1907 when the American Ruskin College moved there from Glen Ellyn, Illinois. The college closed in 1917 after most students had left and most of the buildings burned down.

== Natural history ==
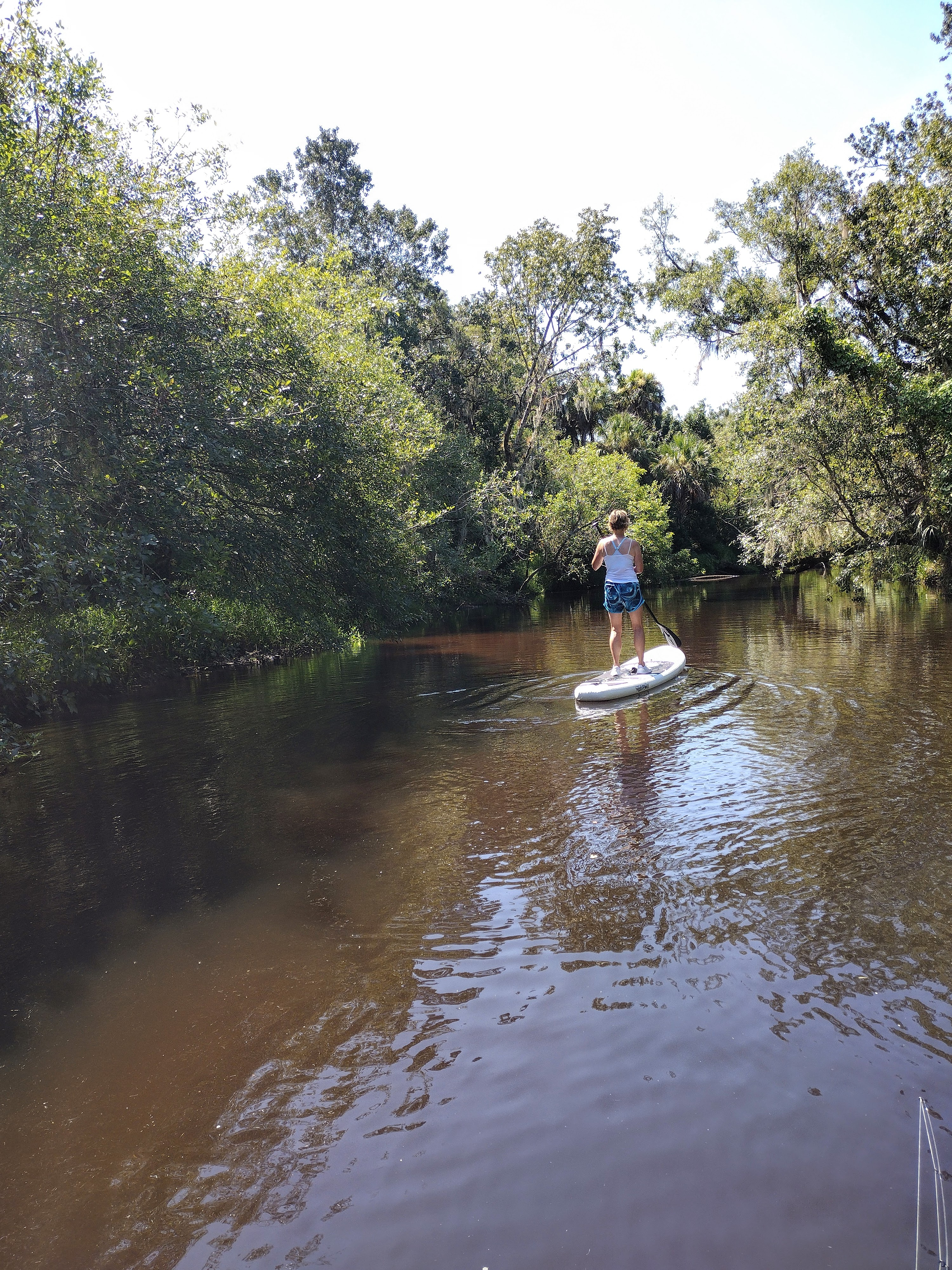
Heading up river from the Little Manatee River State Park kayak launch

The Little Manatee River flows over a sandy sedimentary layer that is 10 to 60 metres (33 to 197 ft) thick. Under that is a layer of impermiable clay, which in turm lies on limestone of the Hawthorn Group. Natural communities along the river include floodplain forests, scrub, hydric, mesic, and xeric hammocks, mesic flatwoods, scrubby flatwoods, upland mixed forest, baygalls, sandhills, depression marshes, and blackwater stream. Mangrove swamps occur near the mouth of the river where the water is brackish. There are also areas of developed and disturbed land. In 1991, 89% of the river's watershed was used as farmland and pasturage. The river does not receive significant industrial runoff, and the water quality of most of the river is classified as good. As of 2025, some abandoned farm fields and citrus orchards in the watershed were being rehabilitated.

== Sources ==
- Boning, Charles R. (2007). Florida's Rivers. Sarasota, Florida: Pineapple Press. ISBN 978-1-56164-400-1.
- Estevez, Ernest D.; Dixon, L. Kellie; Flannery, Michael S. (1991). "West-Coastal Rivers of Peninsular Florida". In Livingston, Robert J. (ed.). The Rivers of Florida. Ecological Studies 83. New York: Springer-Verlag. pp. 187–221. ISBN 0-387-97363-X.
- Luer, George M.; Almy, Marion M. (September 1981). "Temple Mounds of the Tampa Bay Area". The Florida Anthropologist. 34 (3): 127–155.
- Milanich, Jerald T.; Hudson, Charles (1993). Hernando de Soto and the Indians of Florida. Gainesville, Florida: University Press of Florida. ISBN 0-8130-1170-1.
- Myers, James H., Jr.; Wunderlin, Richard P. (2003). "Vascular Flora of Little Manatee River State Park, Hillsborough County, Florida". Castanea. 68 (1): 56–74. ISSN 0008-7475.
- Williams, John (1837a). The Territory of Florida, Or, Sketches of Topography, Civil and Natural History, of the Country, the Climate and the Indian Tribes, from the First Discovery to the Present Time, With a Map, Views, &C. A.T. Goodrich.
- Williams, John (1837b). "Williams's Florida, 1837 (map)". Florida Memory.
- "Little Manatee River Corridor Nature Preserve - Leonard Lee Trailhead". Hillsborough County government. August 6, 2025.
