= Sun City, Florida =

Unincorporated community in Florida, US

- Unincorporated community
- Location within Florida Location within the United States
- Coordinates: 27°40′42″N 82°28′43″W
- Country: United States
- State: Florida
- County: Hillsborough
- Elevation: 26 ft (7.9 m)
- Time zone: UTC-5 (Eastern (EST))
  - Summer (DST): UTC-4 (EDT)
- ZIP code: 33586
- Area code: 813
- GNIS feature ID: 291813

Sun City is an unincorporated community in southern Hillsborough County, Florida, United States. It is located along U.S. Route 41, approximately 4 miles (6.4 km) southwest of Ruskin and west of the separate retirement community of Sun City Center.

Historically known for a failed 1920s attempt to become a film production hub rivaling Hollywood, the community today is largely rural and residential. It hosts a post office with the ZIP Code 33586.

== History ==
=== "Florida's Moving Picture City" ===
Sun City was established in 1925 during the height of the Florida land boom of the 1920s. Promoters, including H.C. Van Swearingen and J.H. Meyer of the Sun City Holding Company, envisioned the development as "Florida's Moving Picture City"—a "Hollywood of the East" designed to lure the motion picture industry to the state.

The town plan was ambitious, featuring streets named after prominent film stars of the era, such as Charlie Chaplin, Betty Blythe, and Olga Petrova. To anchor the development, the developers constructed a $300,000 movie studio (equivalent to roughly $5.2 million in 2023), along with a power plant, a water system, and a school.

Despite the heavy promotion, the project collapsed when the Florida land bubble burst in the mid-1920s. Only two short comedy films were ever produced at the studio. By 1932, the studio equipment was dismantled to satisfy creditors, netting only $1,500.

=== Post-boom decline ===
Following the failure of the movie colony scheme, the studio building was repurposed for various uses, including a shellac factory and housing for farm laborers, before eventually burning down in 1972. By the late 1930s, the Federal Writers' Project described Sun City as a "ghost town in the flatwoods" with a population of only 85.

The community remained a small agricultural outpost throughout the 20th century. In the 1960s, Del Webb developed a large retirement community several miles to the east known as Sun City Center; while the names are similar, the two communities are distinct entities.

== Geography ==
Sun City is located at 27°40′42″N 82°28′43″W (27.67833, -82.47861), at an elevation of 26 feet (7.9 m). It is situated near the southeastern shore of Tampa Bay, south of the Little Manatee River.

The community is centered near the intersection of U.S. Route 41 (Tamiami Trail) and Universal Drive. The surrounding area consists of agricultural land, mining operations, and low-density residential housing.

== Education ==
The community is served by Hillsborough County Public Schools. Students in the area typically attend:

- Ruskin Elementary School
- Shields Middle School
- Lennard High School

== See also ==
- Sun City Center, Florida – A nearby census-designated place.
- Ruskin, Florida
- Florida land boom of the 1920s
