= Cockroach Key =

- U.S. National Register of Historic Places
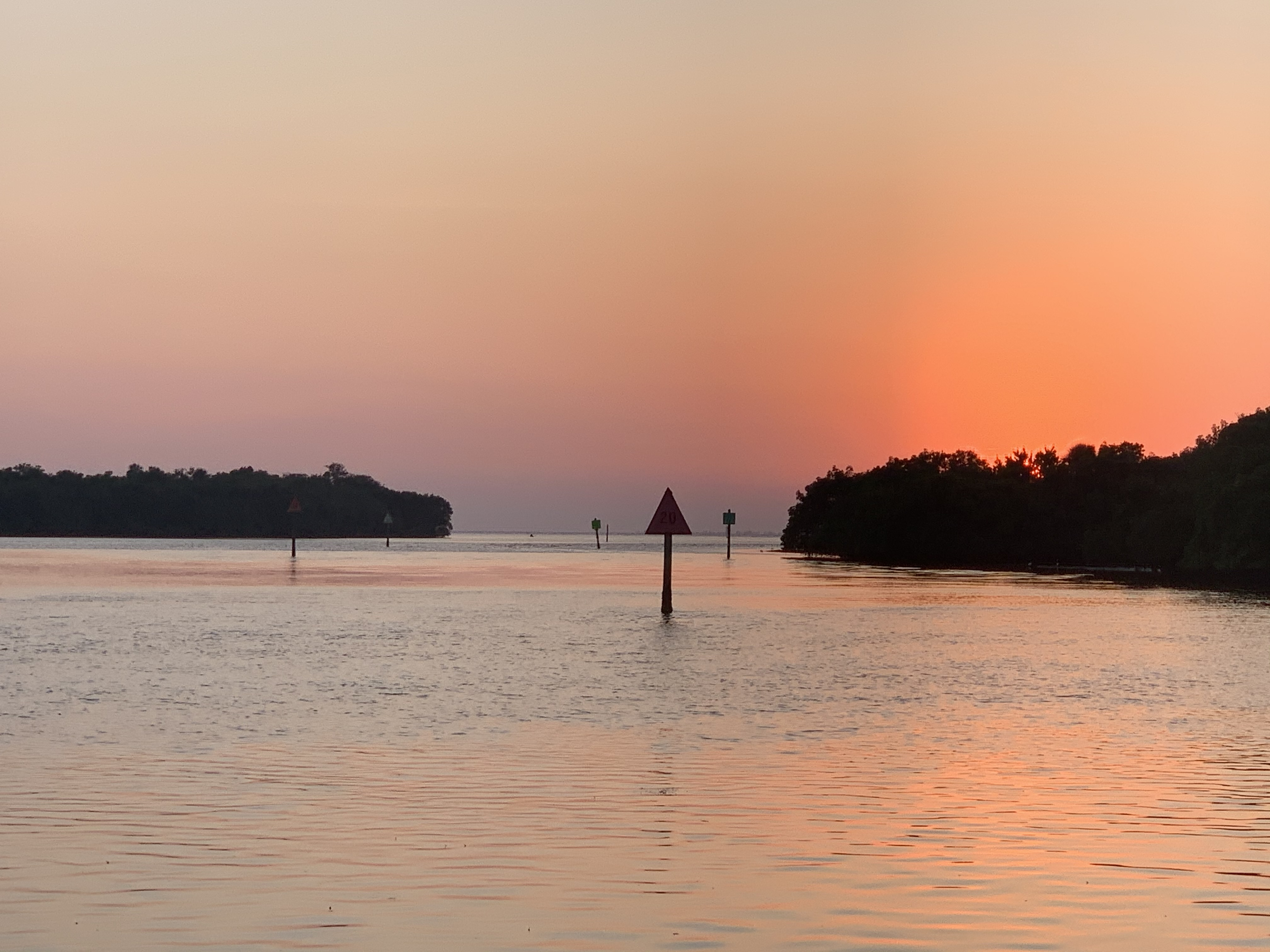
- Cockroach Key at sunset

- Location within Florida Location within the United States
- Location: Hillsborough County, Florida
- Nearest city: Ruskin
- Coordinates: 27°41′04″N 82°31′19″W
- Area: 0.8 acres (0.32 ha)
- Built: approximately 700 AD
- NRHP reference No.: 73000579
- Added to NRHP: December 4, 1973

Cockroach Key (also known as the Indian Hill and the Indian Key) is a historic site near Ruskin, Florida, United States. It is located south of the Little Manatee River, roughly three miles west of Sun City. On December 4, 1973, it was added to the U.S. National Register of Historic Places.
