= City Center, Florida =

City Center, Florida may refer to:

- City Center, Miami Beach, Florida, a neighborhood in Miami Beach.
- An incorrect term for Sun City Center, Florida.
