= Addie Dickman Miller =

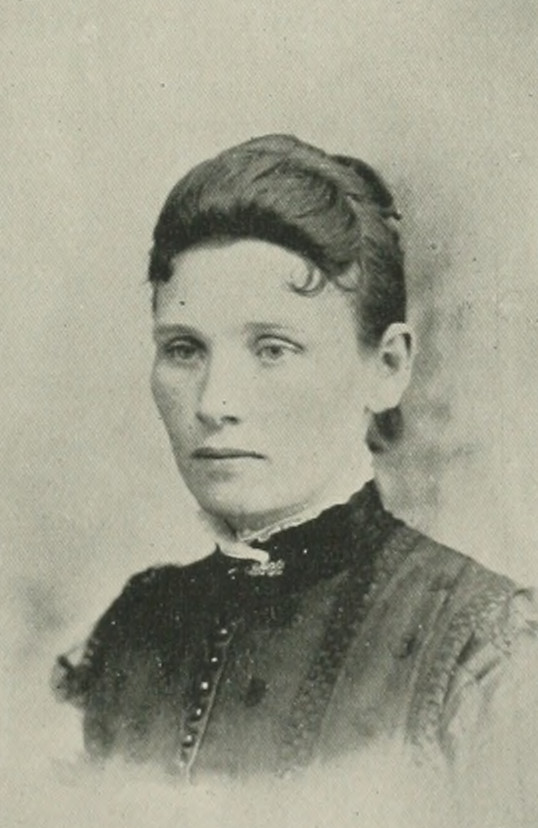
Portrait photo in A Woman of the Century

Adaline "Addie" Dickman Miller (July 26, 1859 – 1936) was an American college professor, a founder of the town of Ruskin, Florida, and the co-founder and vice-president of the town's Ruskin College. She patented a design for a dish washer and she was president of two different temperance organizations in Oregon.

== Early life and education ==
Adaline "Addie" Dickman was born in West Union, Iowa, to John Dickman and Lydia Jane (Newton) Dickman. She was raised on a farm in a nearby town. Although she had only intermittent schooling, she became a teacher at the age of 15. She went on to study at Western College (later Leander Clark College), focusing on Latin and the sciences and continuing to teach during her vacations. She graduated with a B.S. in 1881.

== Early academic career ==
On leaving Western College, she took a position as chair of history and literature at Avalon College in Avalon, Missouri, later also teaching German. At the end of her first year, she married George McAnelly Miller, a former Chicago prosecuting attorney and professor of ancient languages at Avalon College.

In 1883, Addie and George moved to Oregon, where both took positions at Philomath College in the town of Philomath. Addie taught German and superintended the young women's department, while George was the college president. In 1886, when George ran for Congress, Addie took over as acting college president.

== Writing and social activism ==
For a time in the late 1880s, the couple lived in Portland, Oregon, where Addie gave up teaching for writing and working in the temperance movement. She served as president of the Oregon Temperance Alliance and for two years as president of the Portland Woman's Christian Temperance Union.

For a few years, Addie edited the women's section of West Shore, a Portland periodical. She also published a series of "Letters to Our Girls" in eastern magazines. In 1890, she invented and patented a dishwashing machine.

== Ruskin College years ==
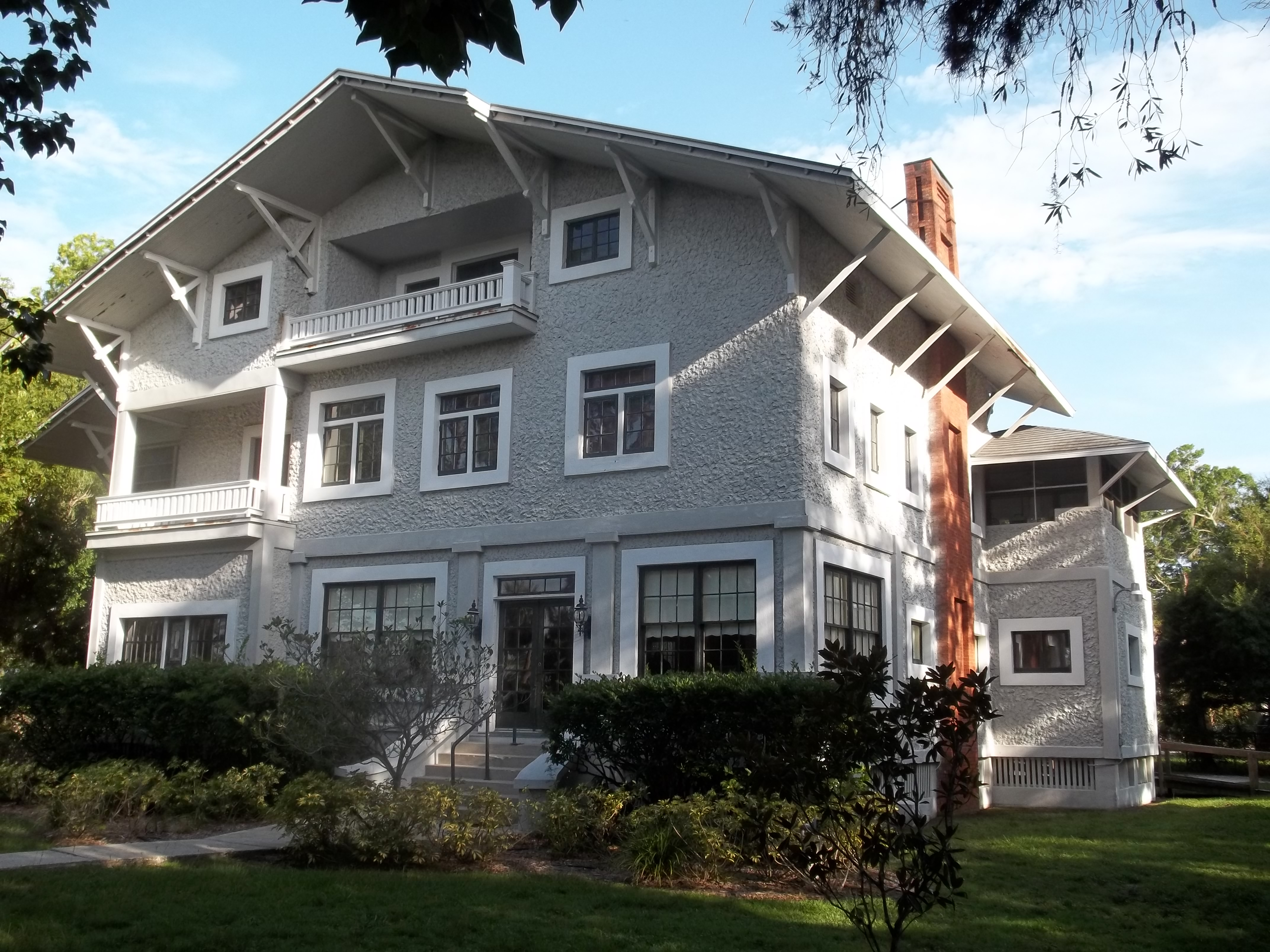
The President's house is now a Historic Place

In 1907, the Millers and their four children moved to what is now Ruskin, Florida, where on August 7, 1908, Addie set up a post office; this date is taken to be the town's official founding day. There in 1910 the Millers founded Ruskin College, an outgrowth of the British Ruskin Hall Movement, which foregrounded socialist principles of the dignity of labor. Addie was vice-president of Ruskin College and George was president. By 1913 their school had 160 students. In 1919, the college burned down, although the Millers' house was spared and is now on the National Register of Historic Places; it currently houses the Ruskin Woman's Club.

Addie died in 1936, surviving George by 17 years.
