= Florida State Road 674 =

State highway in Florida, United States

State Road 674

Route information
- Maintained by FDOT
- Length: 25.509 mi (41.053 km)

Major junctions
- West end: US 41 in Ruskin
- I-75 near Ruskin; US 301 between Sun City Center and Wimauma
- East end: SR 37 south of Bradley Junction

Location
- Country: United States
- State: Florida
- Counties: Hillsborough, Polk

Highway system
- Florida State Highway System; Interstate; US; State; Former; Pre‑1945; Toll; Scenic
← SR 666	→ SR 676

Florida State Road 674 (SR 674) begins in Ruskin, Hillsborough County, Florida. The road runs east/west and is also known as College Avenue and Sun City Center Boulevard.

== Route description ==
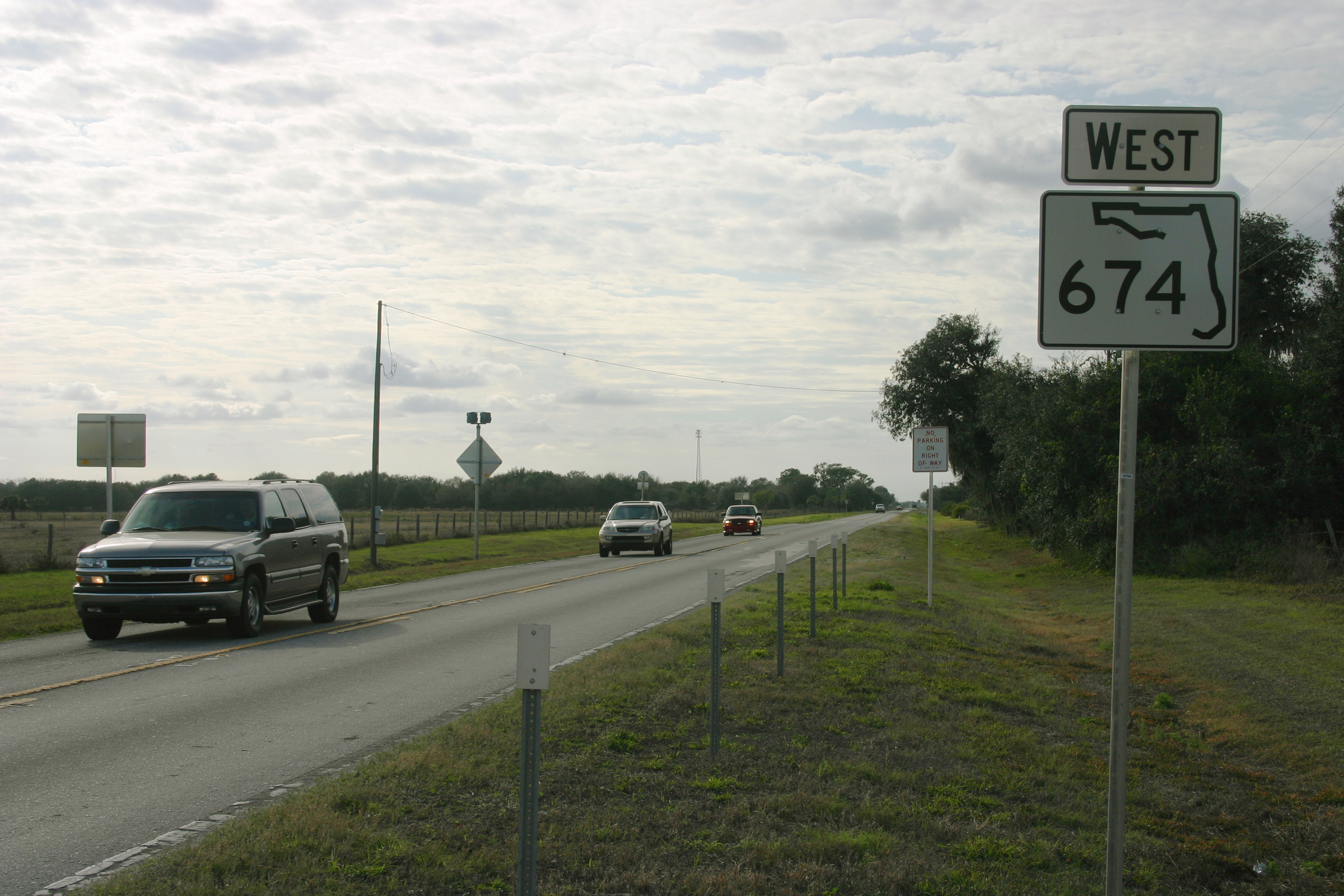
Sign for State Road 674, located in Fort Lonesome

This is a road located in the state of Florida.

== Major intersections ==
County	Location	mi	km	Destinations	Notes
Hillsborough	Ruskin	0.000	0.000	US 41 (SR 45) – Port Manatee	
Hillsborough		3.02	4.86	I-75 (SR 93A) – Tampa, Naples	I-75 exit 240
Hillsborough		6.070	9.769	US 301 (SR 43) – Riverview, Parrish, Little Manatee River State Park	
Hillsborough	Wimauma	8.475	13.639	CR 579 south	
Hillsborough	Fort Lonesome	17.792	28.633	CR 39 – Alafia River State Park	
Polk		25.509	41.053	SR 37 – Mulberry, Lakeland	
1.000 mi = 1.609 km; 1.000 km = 0.621 mi
