= A. P. Dickman House =

Historic house in Florida, United States

- U.S. National Register of Historic Places
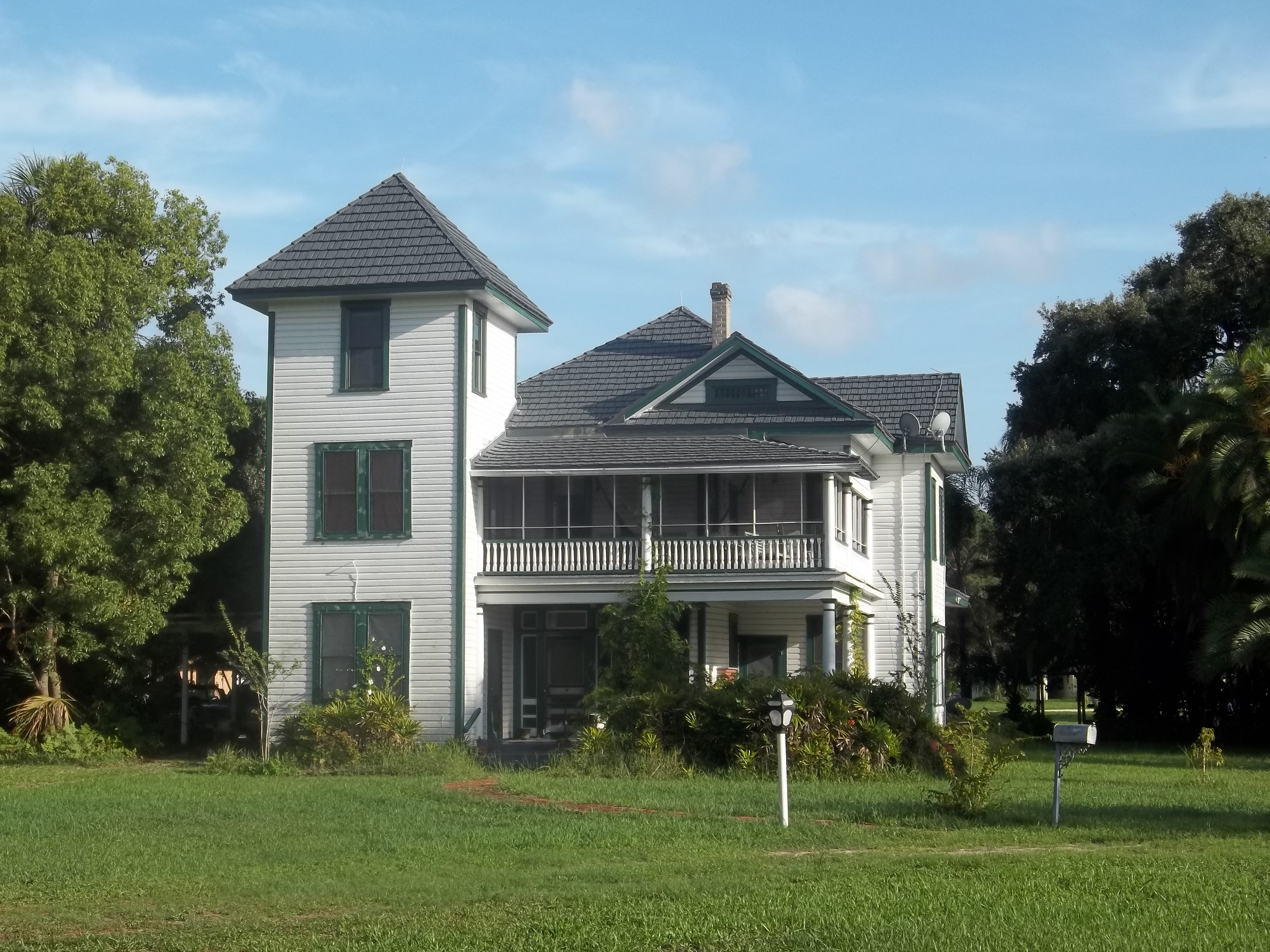

- Location within Florida Location within the United States
- Location: Ruskin, Florida
- Coordinates: 27°43′2″N 82°26′10″W
- Architectural style: Colonial Revival, Queen Anne
- NRHP reference No.: 00000786
- Added to NRHP: July 14, 2000

The A. P. Dickman House, also known as the Ruskin House Bed and Breakfast, is a historic home in Ruskin, Florida built in 1911. It is located at 120 Dickman Drive, Southeast. It was added to the National Register of Historic Places in 2000.

The house combines elements of Colonial Revival and Queen Anne architecture.

The bed and breakfast business has reportedly been closed.
