= Thomas E. Hill (author) =

American writer (1832–1915)

- Born: Thomas Edie Hill; February 29, 1832; Sandgate, Vermont, U.S.
- Died: July 13, 1915 (aged 83); Glen Ellyn, Illinois, U.S.
- Notable work: Hill's Manual of Social and Business Forms
- Spouses: Rebekah J. Pierce (m. 1854, divorced) Ellen Whitcomb (m. 1878)
- Children: 4

Thomas Edie Hill (February 29, 1832 – July 13, 1915) was an American writer of popular reference books, the most successful of which was Hill's Manual of Social and Business Forms. Several of his books contained practical advice for personal improvement, which made them early examples of the self-help genre.

== Biography ==
Born in rural Sandgate, Vermont in Bennington County, Hill was raised on the family farm. He attended Cambridge Academy in Cambridge, New York before becoming a teacher. He taught evening classes in penmanship and forms, and continued teaching for fifteen years across New York, Vermont, Ohio, Wisconsin and Illinois. He settled in the latter state.

His breakthrough as a writer came in 1875 with the publication of Hill's Manual of Social and Business Forms: Guide to Correct Writing. It was the only standard textbook at the time that helped readers with the preparation of business forms and correspondence. In the Preface to the 1875 edition, he specified the object of his book: "To enable the writer, sitting easily and gracefully at the desk, to express thought plainly, rapidly, elegantly and correctly". The manual went through more than twenty editions over the course of three decades and sold an estimated 400,000 copies.

Cover of Hill's 1894 book

Hill's popular 1894 book on finance, Money Found, contained an early proposal for the nationalization of the U.S. banking system.

Throughout his adult life, he pursued entrepreneurial projects that brought him a modest fortune. In 1868 he founded the Hill Standard Book Company. At its peak in the 1880s, the company employed over a thousand agents who circulated Hill's reference books in the U.S. and Canada. He also engaged in land speculation and suburban development. His Suburban Chicago Purchasing Agency "attracted investment capital to varied real estate projects on Chicago's outskirts." He lived in Aurora, Illinois for twelve years. In 1876 he was elected the town's first mayor. While there, he launched the Aurora Herald newspaper, serving as its editor, and also managed the Aurora Silver Plate factory.

In 1885, Hill moved with his second wife Ellen to the village of Prospect Park in DuPage County, Illinois. He quickly became village president and worked to develop the community. He partnered with Philo Stacy in 1889 to dam a nearby creek, thus creating a 50-acre lake that Hill called Lake Glen Ellyn ("Ellyn" being the Welsh spelling of his wife's name). In 1891 he succeeded in changing the village's name to Glen Ellyn. Hill financed the building of a 100-room hotel, overlooking the lake. The Hotel Glen Ellyn opened in 1892.

Hill was an ostentatious figure in the village. He strolled about "in a plum colored overcoat with a cape to it and a black slouch hat." To impress visitors, he would dispatch his expensive private carriage to retrieve them from the local train depot.

In 1903, he helped George McAnelly Miller establish Ruskin College in Glen Ellyn. Hill made an arrangement in which the college could utilize several of his buildings, including his 100-room hotel.

Hill lost most of his fortune to unwise speculations. He spent his final years earning money strictly through his writing. He died on July 13, 1915, at age 83. His wife Ellen died the following January. They are both buried in Glen Ellyn's Forest Hill Cemetery.

== Bibliography ==
- Hill, Thomas E. (1875). Hill's Manual of Social and Business Forms: Guide to Correct Writing. Chicago: Moses Warren & Co.
- —— (1880). The Rules of Conduct That Govern Good Society: The Laws of Etiquette, What to Say and What to Do. LCCN 2004-673245.
- —— (1881). Hill's Album of Biography and Art. Chicago: Hill Standard Book Company.
- —— (1883). Ways of Cruelty: with practical suggestions illustrated. Animal Welfare. Chicago: Albert W. Landon. OCLC 1005934700. Co-written with the Illinois Humane Society.
- —— (1884). Right and Wrong, Contrasted. Chicago: Hill Standard Book Company. LCCN 15-3364.
- —— (1890). Hillerian System of Penmanship. Waukegan, Illinois: Jones, Perdue & Small. OCLC 35805074.
- —— (1892). Hill's Souvenir Guide to Chicago and the World's Fair. Chicago: Laird & Lee.
- —— (1894). Hill's Political History of the United States. Chicago: Hill Standard Book Company. LCCN 10-9586.
- —— (1894). Money Found: Recovered from its Hiding-Places, and Put into Circulation Through Confidence in Government Banks. Chicago: Charles H. Kerr & Co. OCLC 1632396.
- —— (1901). Illustrated Duluth: A condensed guide to the streets, public buildings, business blocks, residences, parks, and features of interest. Duluth, Minnesota: Duluth Improvement Association. OCLC 19380370.
- —— (1901). The School Library Encyclopedia: Embracing History, Geography, Discovery, Invention, Biography, Arts, Sciences, and Literature. Chicago: The Caxton Company. LCCN 01-18469. A four-volume encyclopedia. Edited by L. Brent Vaughan.
- —— (1902). Hill's Practical Reference Library of General Knowledge. Toledo, Ohio: Dixon & Hanson LCCN 02-16944. Edited by L. Brent Vaughan.
- —— (1911). Hill's Manual of Business and Social Information. Chicago: W. B. Conkey Co. OCLC 3746746.
- —— (1912). Hill's Reference Guide for Land Seekers, Travelers, Schools, Tourists, Emigrants and General Readers. Chicago: Hill Standard Book Company. OCLC 20988258.
- —— (1915). The Open Door to Independence: Making Money From the Soil: What to Do—How to Do, on City Lots, Suburban Grounds, Country Farms. Chicago: Hill Standard Book Company. LCCN 15-6652.
