= Ruskin High School =

Ruskin High School may refer to:

- Ruskin High School, Crewe, a secondary school in Crewe, Cheshire, England
- Ruskin High School (Kansas City, Missouri), United States

== See also ==
- John Ruskin School, Coniston, Cumbria, England
- Ruskin (disambiguation)
