= George McA. Miller House =

Historic house in Florida, United States

- U.S. National Register of Historic Places
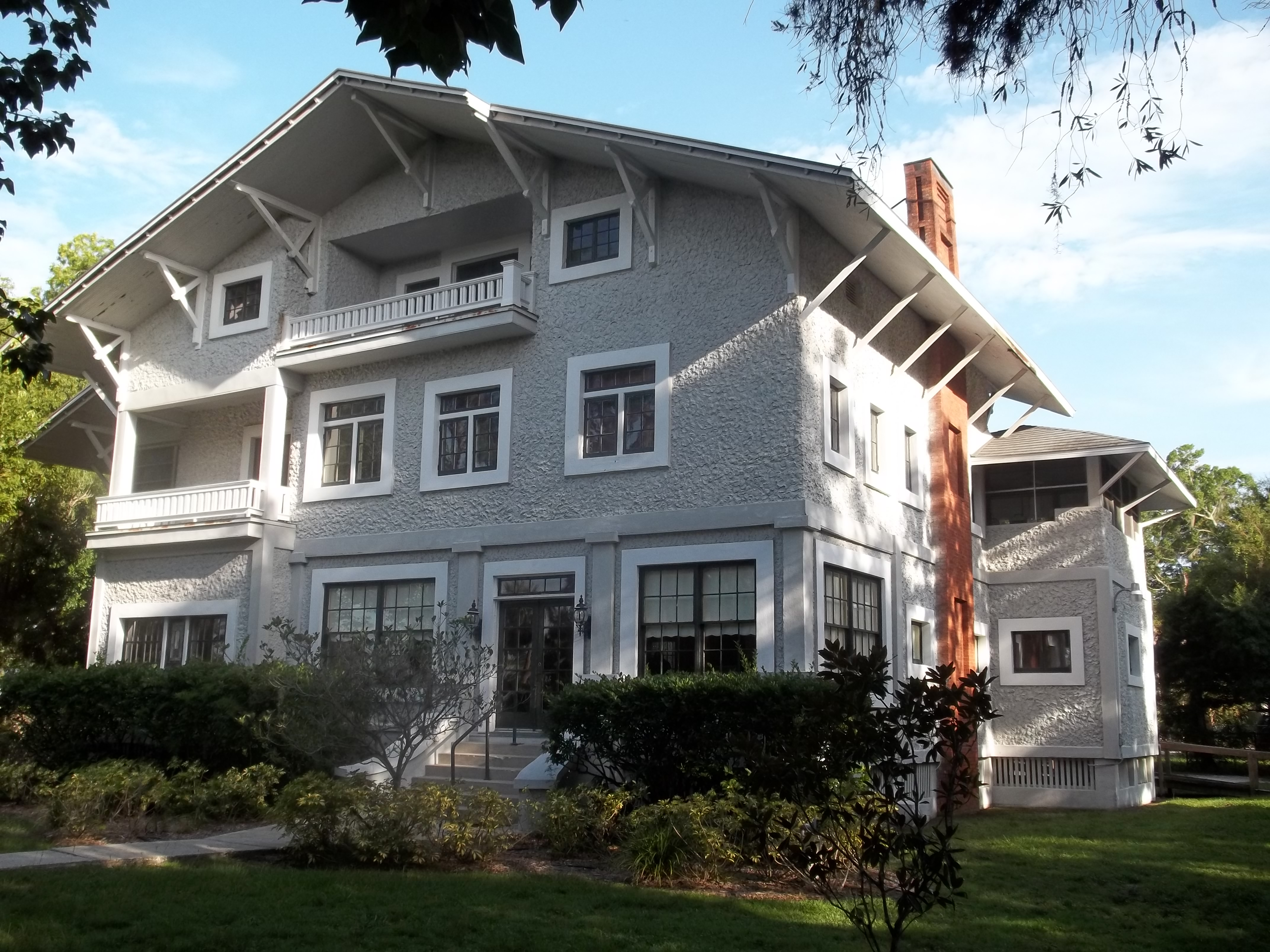
- The George McA. Miller House

- Location within Florida Location within the United States
- Location: Ruskin, Florida
- Coordinates: 27°42′49″N 82°26′5″W
- NRHP reference No.: 74000630
- Added to NRHP: July 23, 1974

The George McA. Miller House (also known as the Ruskin Women's Club) is a historic home in Ruskin, Florida. It is located at 503 Tamiami Trail. It was built in early 1900s as the residence of George McAnelly Miller, president of Ruskin College and his wife Addie Dickman Miller, the college's vice-president. It currently houses the Ruskin Woman's Club.

On July 23, 1974, it was added to the US National Register of Historic Places.
