= Ruskin Colleges =

Group of U.S. colleges named after John Ruskin

The Ruskin Colleges were a group of American colleges established in the early 20th century, principally by philology professor George McAnelly Miller, and by socialist philanthropist Walter Vrooman. The schools were patterned after Oxford, England's Ruskin Hall, which Vrooman had cofounded. A core idea was for students to gain vocational training and pay for their education by working in a cooperative business associated with the college. The three Ruskin Colleges were located in Missouri, Illinois, and Florida.

== History ==
=== Trenton, Missouri ===
After cofounding Ruskin Hall in Oxford, England in 1899, Walter Vrooman returned to the United States. The next year, he and his wife began working with George McAnelly Miller to save the Missouri-based Avalon College. The school was facing financial difficulties following its recent move to Trenton from the small town of Avalon. After Vrooman raised an initial $20,000 and donated 1500 acres of land, Avalon College was renamed Ruskin College, making it the first of what was intended to be a series in the U.S. Associated with the new college were two cooperatives: Multitude Incorporated and the Western Co-Operative Association.

At Ruskin College, students received vocational training and earned part of their tuition by working in the college's woodworking, sewing, canning, and farming businesses. Their coursework ranged from business and oratory to art and music. There were also correspondence courses in English, journalism, architecture, metallurgy, and several kinds of engineering. Faculty included George D. Herron and Frank Parsons, who served as dean of the correspondence course division. Unlike its British counterpart, the American Ruskin College was coeducational, as were its successors.

The college grew to 80 regular students and 200 correspondence students in its first year. By 1902, despite the fact that Vrooman and his associates had already spent several hundred thousand dollars supporting the institution, Ruskin College was in financial straits. The difficulties stemmed from a combination of bad management, poor crop years at the college farm, and resistance from local businesses threatened by competition from the college's cooperatives.

=== Glen Ellyn, Illinois ===
In 1903, Miller moved the college to Glen Ellyn, Illinois, a suburb of Chicago, where author and publisher Thomas E. Hill converted his Hotel Glen Ellyn into the college's main building. Miller served as dean, and the faculty included the writer May Wood Simons. This second Ruskin College amalgamated with a dozen other colleges, including Chicago Law School, turning itself into Ruskin University. The new university's chancellor was J. J. Tobias, who was also chancellor of the law school. It attained an enrollment of 2,500 with another 8,000 correspondence students. However, the college quickly had a funding shortfall, and Miller decided that for a socialist college such as he envisioned to survive, it needed to be away from established businesses antagonistic to its cooperative structure, and it needed enough land to thrive as an independent entity.

=== Ruskin, Florida ===
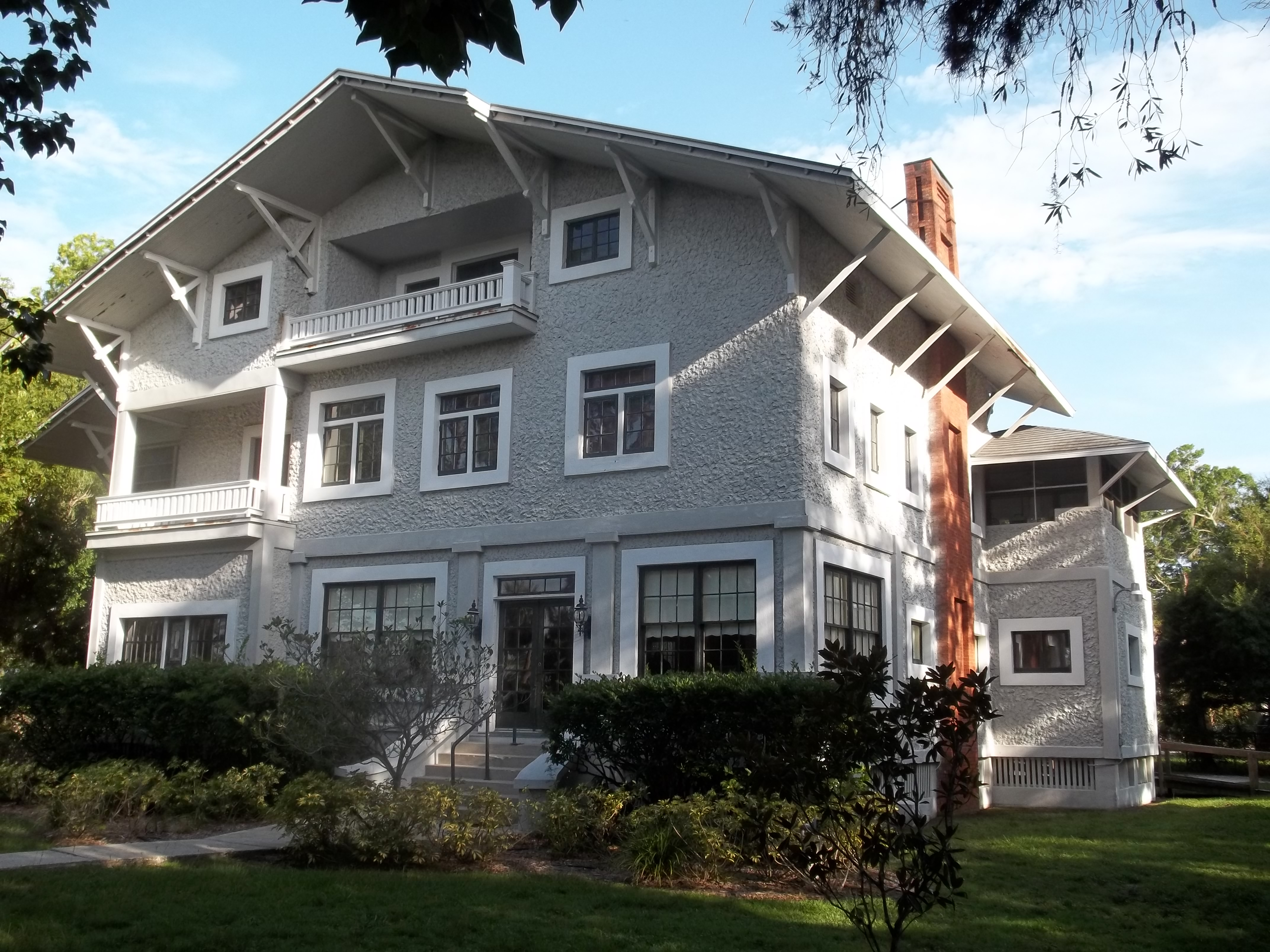
The George McA. Miller House, formerly the president's house for Ruskin College in Ruskin, Florida.

Miller decided to move the college again, this time settling on an area that developed into the town of Ruskin, Florida. Miller and his wife, Addie Dickman Miller, moved there in 1907, along with the family of one of Addie's brothers, Albert P. Dickman. They acquired some 12,000 acres of pine-forested land that included a turpentine camp, which became their temporary headquarters. They set up a sawmill, cleared land, and built the town from scratch. Building lots were also sold, and buyers of these acreages became members of a cooperative called the Ruskin Commongood Society that made infrastructure improvements to the burgeoning town, including building a new Ruskin College. Some members of the new community came from two Ruskin-inspired colonies elsewhere in the South that had failed: the Ruskin Colony in Tennessee (where there were plans, never finalized, for another Ruskin College), and Duke Colony in Ware County, Georgia.

The new college opened its doors in 1910, with Miller as president and Addie as vice-president. Socialist newspapers nationwide wrote up the college, and students came from as far away as Japan. By 1913 the school had 160 students studying literature, music, drama, social sciences, shorthand, and speech. Once again, students worked part of each day to help pay for their education.

In 1917, the advent of World War I meant that most of the students left the school for some form of war service, creating new financial difficulties. In 1919, most of the college burned down, although the Millers' house was spared and is now on the National Register of Historic Places; it currently houses the Ruskin Woman's Club. When George Miller died later that same year, the college closed.
