= Cockroach Bay Aquatic Preserve =

Nature preserve, United States of America

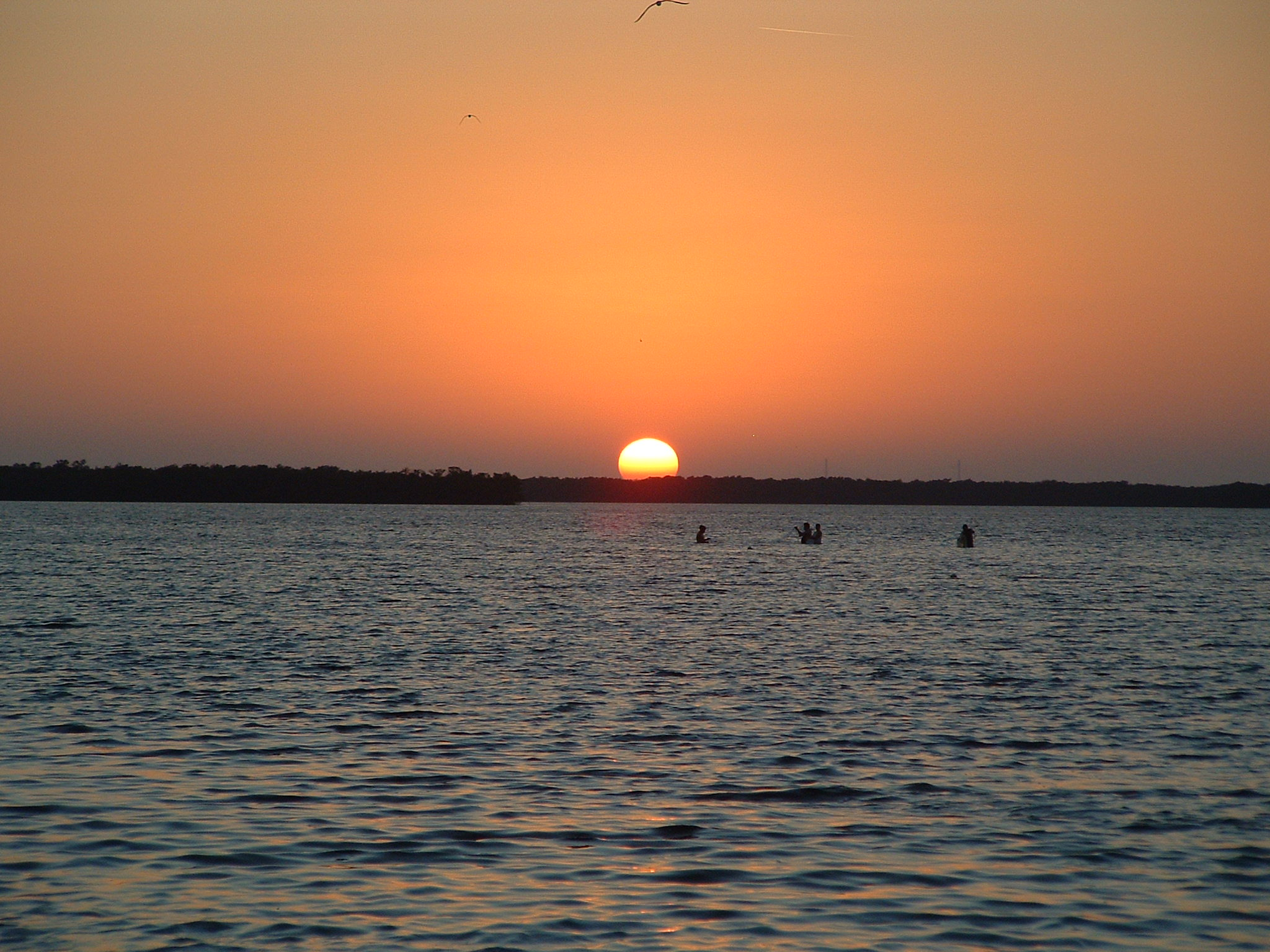
- View over Cockroach Bay at sunset

- Location within Florida
- Interactive map of Cockroach Bay Aquatic Preserve
- Location: Tampa, Florida
- Coordinates: 27.684°N 82.524°W
- Area: 4,800-acre (19 km^{2})

Cockroach Bay Aquatic Preserve is a protected area that includes 4,800 acres of partially submerged lands in Hillsborough County near Ruskin, Florida south of Tampa, Florida. Archaeological evidence from indigenous tribes has been found in the area. The coastal uplands, freshwater wetlands and estuarine habitats provide sanctuary for young fish including red drum and snook as well as numerous birds, crustaceans and other species. Aquatic habitats include seagrass and oyster beds.

The area was farmland and mining pits before a 21-year restoration that included approximately 2,500 volunteers, environmental groups, and government agencies. The area was dedicated in 2012. It includes 651 acres and has hosted at least 300 species of bird. The preserve's street address is at 3709 Gulf City Road in Ruskin, Florida.

Cockroach Bay has frequently been noted on lists of unusual place names.
