= Earl J. Lennard High School =

Coordinates: 27°43′22.7″N 82°24′15″W

Location
- 2002 E Shell Point Road; Ruskin, Florida 33570; United States

Information
- Type: Public high school
- Motto: Guiding graduates to a life of purpose.
- Established: 2006
- School district: Hillsborough County Public Schools
- Principal: Denise Savino
- Staff: 101.00 (FTE)
- Enrollment: 2,422 (2023–2024)
- Student to teacher ratio: 23.98
- Colors: Purple, white, and gold
- Team name: Longhorns
- Website: www.hillsboroughschools.org/o/lennard

Earl J. Lennard High School is a public high school in Ruskin, Florida, United States. Opened in 2006, it relieved overcrowding at East Bay High School in Gibsonton, Florida. It is named after former Hillsborough County Public Schools superintendent Dr. Earl J. Lennard.

== Demographics ==
Lennard HS is 52.14% Hispanic, 24.63% White, 15.69% Black, 1.83% Asian, 0.39% Native American, and 5.32% multiracial.

== Notable alumni ==
- Diontae Johnson, NFL wide receiver
