= Ruskin (surname) =

Ruskin, also Russkin, Russkina, Ruskina, is a surname of English, Scottish, French, Danish, German origin, thought to come from Old Norse plus Northern Old English elements, referring to rush plants (the reeds that grow in wetlands). Another etymology is as variant spelling of topographic or geographic names. In Russia, United States and some Asian countries it is often a surname of those with Jewish background.

== People ==
- Effie Ruskin (1828–1897), Scottish artists' model, wife of John Ruskin
- Harry Ruskin (1894–1969), American screenwriter and lyricist
- Ira Ruskin (1943–2014), American politician
- John Ruskin (1819–1900), English polymath, author, poet and artist
- Nardwuar, born John Ruskin in 1968, Canadian journalist and musician
- Joseph Ruskin (1924–2013), American character actor born Joseph Richard Schlafman
- Morris Ruskin (born 1962), American independent film and television producer and entrepreneur
- Pamela Ruskin (1920–2010), Australian freelance journalist
- Scott Ruskin (baseball) (born 1963), American baseball player
- Scott Ruskin (cricketer) (born 1975), English cricketer
- Sheila Ruskin (born 1946), English actress
- Susan Ruskin, American film producer

== Fictional characters ==
- Edward Ruskin, in the British soap opera Emmerdale Farm
- Maria Ruskin, in the 1987 novel The Bonfire of the Vanities and its film adaptation

== See also ==
- Val Rapava-Ruskin (born 1992), English rugby union player
- Ruskin (given name)
