= Little Manatee River State Park =

State park in Florida, United States

- IUCN category III (natural monument or feature)
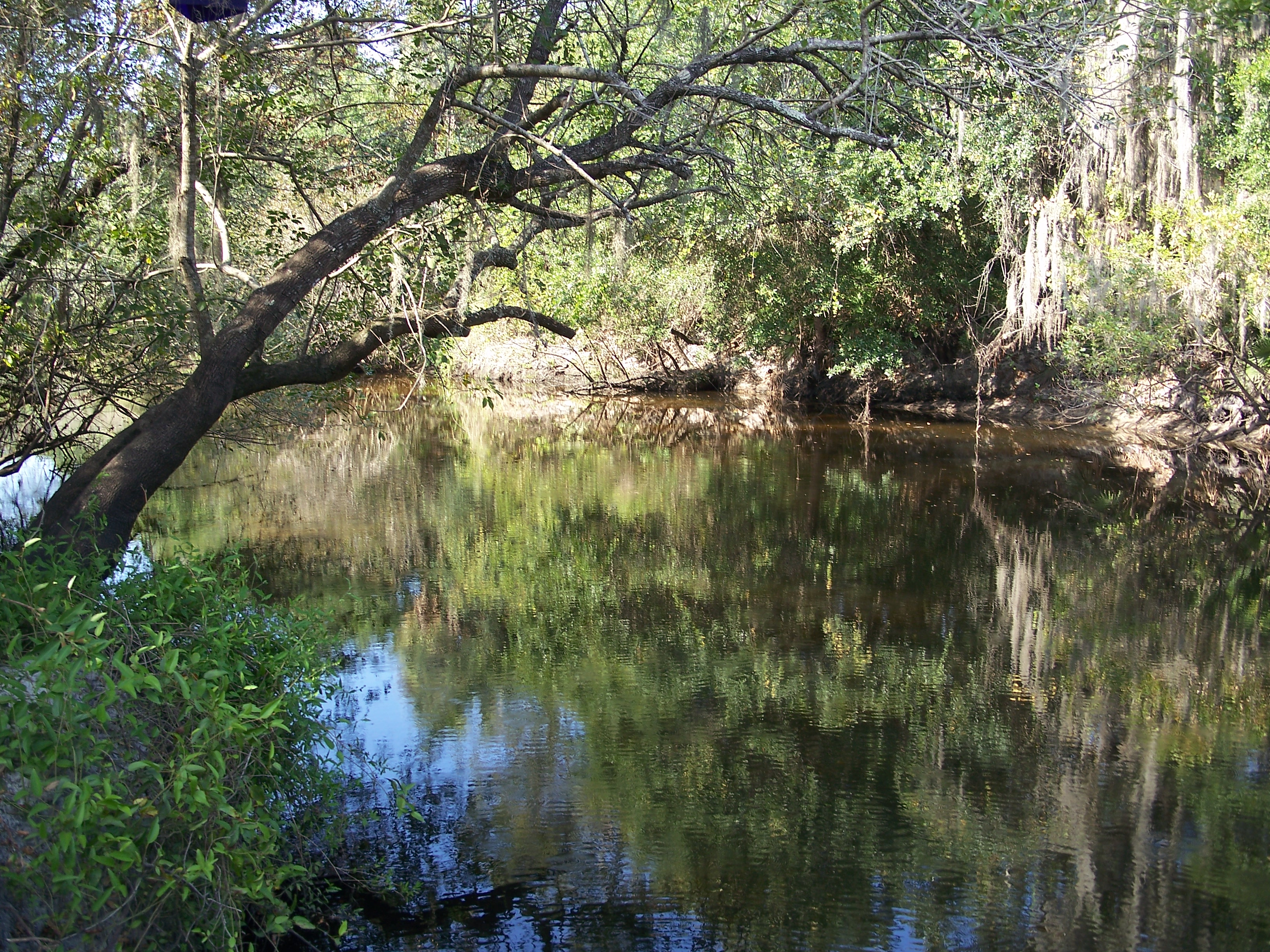
- A view from the river bank

- Location within Florida Location within the United States
- Interactive map of Little Manatee River State Park
- Location: Hillsborough County, Florida, USA
- Nearest city: Brandon, Florida
- Coordinates: 27°40′16″N 82°21′22″W
- Area: 2,433 acres or 985 ha
- Average elevation: 6 m
- Governing body: Florida Department of Environmental Protection

Little Manatee River State Park is a 2,433-acre (985 ha) Florida State Park located 5 miles (8.0 km) south of Sun City, off U.S. Route 301 on Lightfoot Road and along the Little Manatee River. The park was established in 1974 as Little Manatee River State Recreation Area with 663 hectares. It was designated as a state park in March 1999. The Florida Department of Environmental Protection's Division of Recreation and Parks manages that park under a 99-year lease, set to expire April 10, 2074.

== Ecology ==
The park contains sand pine and oak scrub and oxbow wetlands. Within the park, the Little Manatee River runs for 4.5 miles (7.2 km) through 11 natural communities.

A survey of the park's vascular flora was conducted from 1998 and 2000, identifying 523 taxa, 329 genera, and 116 families, of which 436 taxa were native, 88 were introduced, and 29 were endemic to Florida. Ten taxa found within the park are listed as either threatened, endangered, or commercially exploited, including Chrysopsis floridana and Rhynchospora megaplumosa. Among the wildlife of the park are Florida scrub jays, white-tailed deer, warblers, raccoons, nine-banded armadillos, bobcats, American alligators and North American river otters.

== Operations ==
Activities include kayaking, canoeing, fishing, and horseback riding, as well as camping, walking, hiking, and wildlife viewing.

Amenities include a 6.5-mile (10.5 km) hiking trail, 12 miles (19 km) of hiking and equestrian trails and four equestrian campsites, a full-facility campground, a primitive campsite along the trail and a youth/group campground. There is a picnic area along the river with tables, grills, and pavilions. The park is open from 8:00 am till sundown year-round.
