= Ruskin (given name) =

Ruskin is a masculine given name which may refer to:

- Ruskin Bond (born 1934), Indian author of British descent
- Ruskin Fernando (1916–1974), Ceylonese businessman and politician
- Ruskin Mark (born 1957), Trinidadian cricketer
- Ruskin Spear (1911–1990), British painter and art teacher

== See also ==
- Ruskin (surname)
