= Fort Lonesome, Florida =

- Unincorporated community
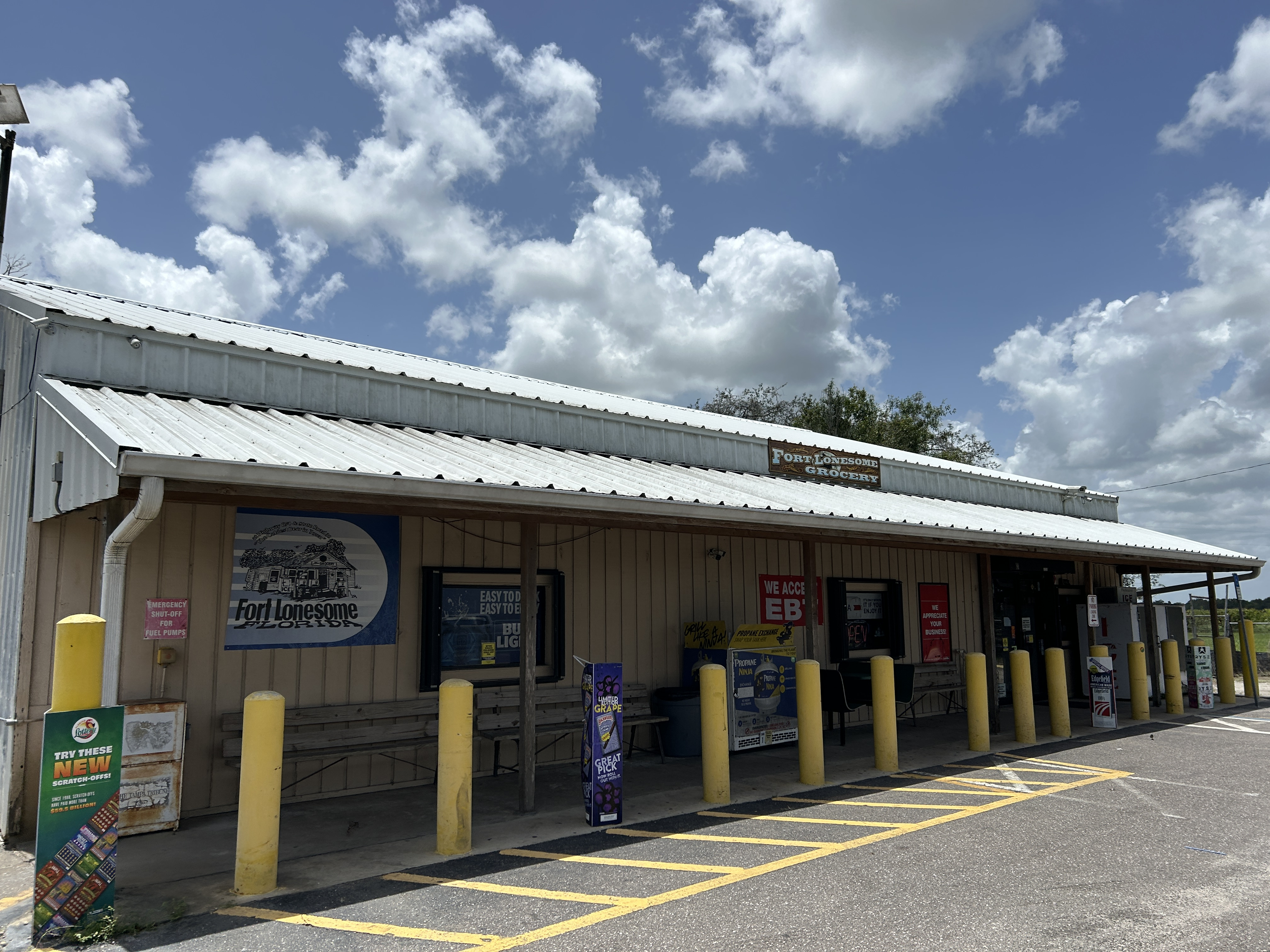
- The convenience store located in Fort Lonesome, July 2024.

- Location within Florida Location within the United States
- Coordinates: 27°42′17″N 82°08′45″W
- Country: United States
- State: Florida
- County: Hillsborough
- Elevation: 121 ft (37 m)
- Time zone: UTC-5 (Eastern (EST))
  - Summer (DST): UTC-4 (EDT)
- GNIS feature ID: 294778

Fort Lonesome is a rural area located in southeastern Hillsborough County, Florida, United States, 36 miles (58 km) southeast of Tampa. A sawmill briefly revived the area with a few houses and three stores in the early 1930s. It was short-lived: a fire destroyed the mill and eventually the "town" disappeared. Today, it is mainly a farming region.

== Geography ==
Fort Lonesome is located at the intersection of State Road 674 (Ruskin-Wimauma Rd) and County Road 39S, the site of a gas station and power substation.

== Education ==
The community is served by Hillsborough County Schools.

== Gallery ==
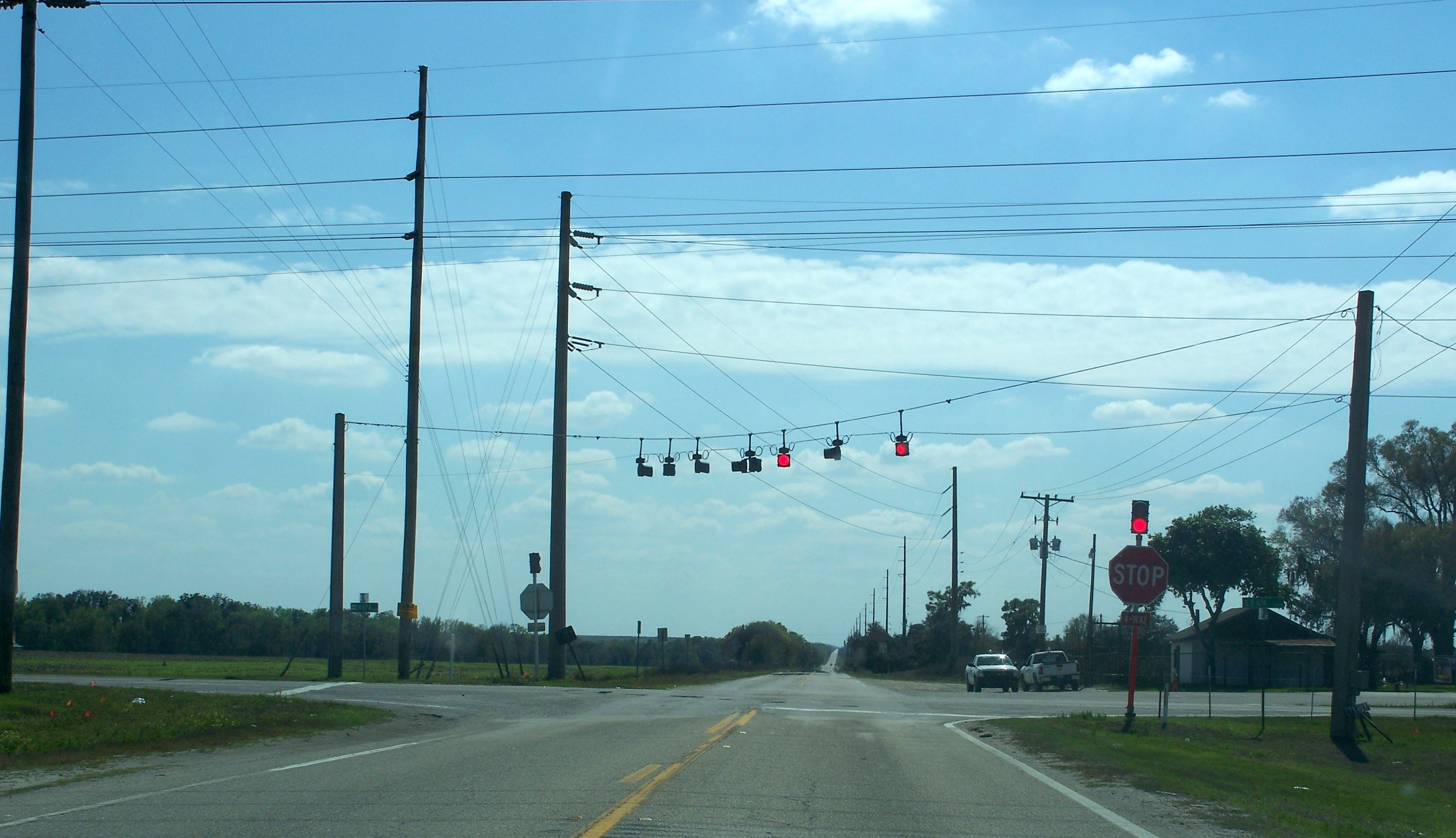
Intersection of Florida State Road 674 and County Road 39 in Fort Lonesome, February 2011.

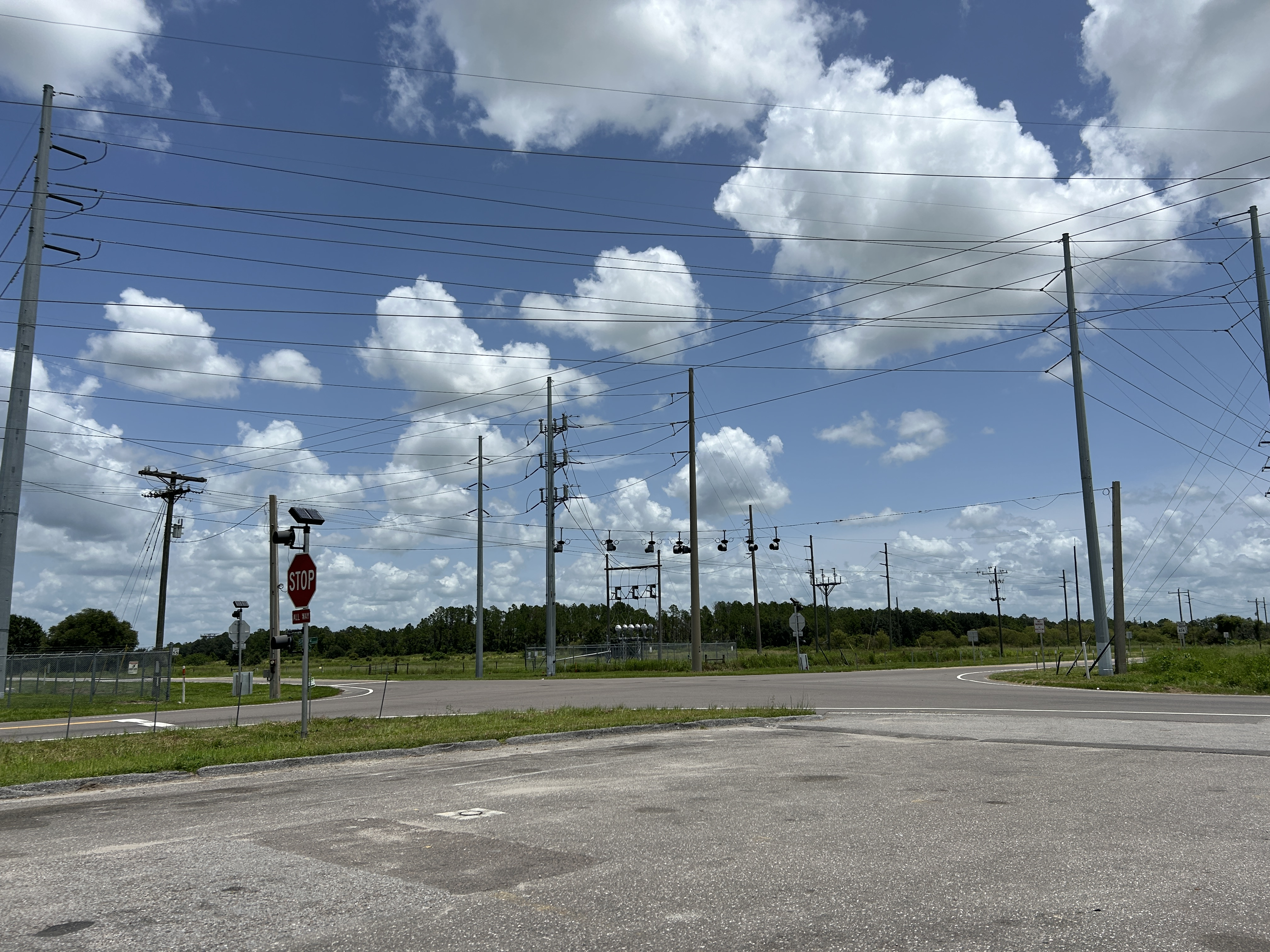
The intersection of State Road 674 and County Road 39 as viewed from Fort Lonesome's convenience store in July 2024.

== See also ==
- List of ghost towns in Florida
