= Ruskin Colony =

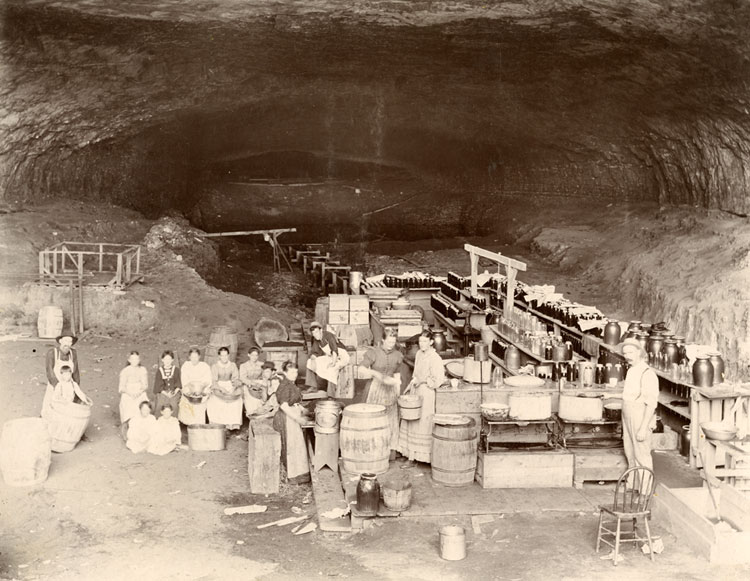
Cannery operation in the Ruskin Cooperative, 1896

The Ruskin Colony (or Ruskin Commonwealth Association) was a utopian socialist colony in the southern US at the end of the 19th century.

It was located near Tennessee City in Dickson County, Tennessee from 1894 to 1896. The colony moved to a more permanent second settlement on an old farm five miles north from 1896 to 1899, and saw another brief incarnation near Waycross, in southern Georgia, from 1899 until it finally dissolved in 1901. Its regional location within the Southern United States set it apart from many other similar utopian projects of the era.

At its high point, the population was around 250. The colony was named after John Ruskin, the English socialist writer. A cave on the colony's second property in Dickson County still carries his name. The site of the colony's second settlement in Dickson County is listed on the National Register of Historic Places.

== Origins and goals ==
- Ruskin Colony Grounds
- U.S. National Register of Historic Places
- Nearest city: Dickson, Tennessee
- Area: 15 acres (6.1 ha)
- NRHP reference No.: 74001911
- Added to NRHP: October 29, 1974

The Ruskin Colony was founded by Julius Augustus Wayland (1854–1912), a newspaper editor and socialist from Indiana. The roots of the Ruskin project can be found in the movement within American socialism at the time, towards the creation of new model colonies which would, in theory, challenge the American industrial system by creating ethical alternatives built in rural settings. The idea that new settlements such as Ruskin would eventually bring forth a revolution referred to as the "co-operative commonwealth" stood in contrast to socialists who believed that it was more important to do political and social organizing within the cities, the centers of industry. According to W. Fitzhugh Brundage in the book A Socialist Utopia in the New South: "The wastefulness and ugliness of competitive individualism, so glaringly apparent in late nineteenth-century cities, would be replaced by the efficient creation and collective control of wealth and technology" in this new settlement.

== Cooperative economics ==
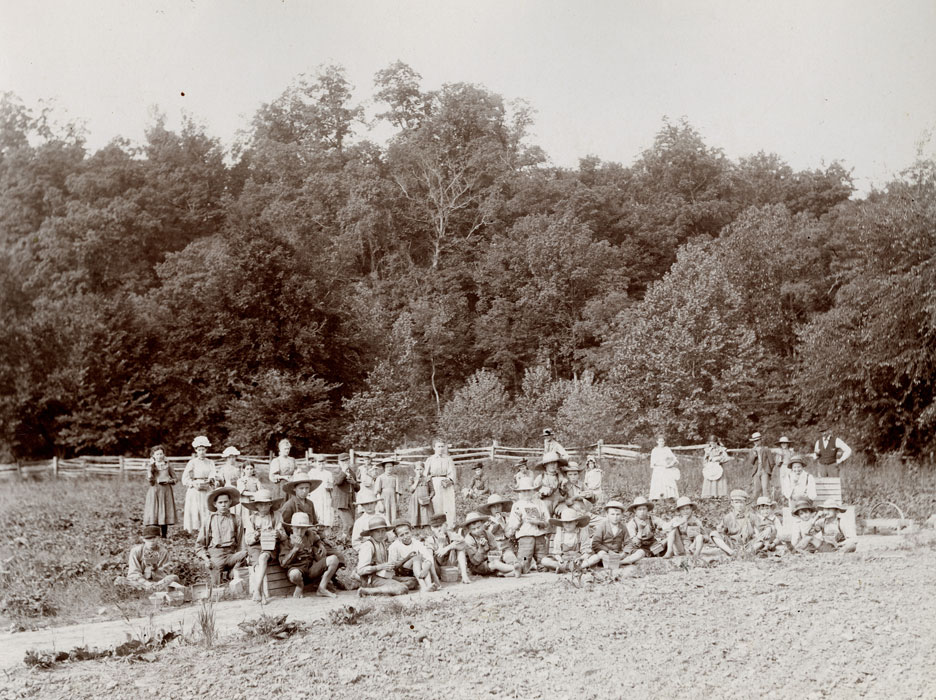
Strawberry Pickers Ruskin Cooperative, 1897

By requiring that all members of the colony become equal shareholders in the endeavor, Wayland constructed Ruskin so that it operated more as a legally-sanctioned corporation. Every colonist was then, in essence, a stockholder. The colony, with its elected board of directors, was to run much like any other company, except that it would "do all things necessary to make a success, financially and socially, of a co-operative colony." (The Coming Nation, Feb. 3, 1894) Ruskin colonists manufactured and marketed pants, "cereal coffee," a vapor bath cabinet, chewing gum, belts and suspenders. The system of work itself changed little from that of the world outside Ruskin, in terms of hours devoted to the various industries, however the hours, schedules and rates of pay, and industries selected were all determined by the workers. Ruskinites eventually abolished cash wages and adopted a system of scrip which was used in exchange for goods within the colony. (This is in line with Edward Bellamy's 1893 plan for a self-sufficient settlement.)

Besides securing their economic dependence, members of the settlement were allowed ample time for creative crafts, theater, and other intellectual pursuits. At one time late in the history of the colony, the community spawned a musical group that toured southern Georgia.

Many of the products created in Ruskin were intended to supplement the income from the newspaper, The Coming Nation, which was the primary source of financial stability. The majority of the colony's money and time was put into the paper, which had at its peak in 1896 around 60,000 subscribers. Besides being the chief flow of assets, the paper also gave voice to the people of the colony throughout its many editors. Although Julius Wayland almost single-handedly founded the colony, he left in 1895 due to conflicts about ownership of the newspaper that ran counter to his claims of collective ownership. Under Alfred S. Edwards, who succeeded Wayland, The Coming Nation included articles from the likes of George D. Herron, Charlotte Perkins Gilman, and Herbert Casson (who later took up the editorial reins after Edwards left the colony).

The eventual breakup of the Ruskin colony was due to several elements, the most problematic being the unequal distribution of membership rights of colonists complicated by the "shareholder"-type initial investment fees. Much of the blame lay with the original charter members, who had become entrenched in leadership and direction of Ruskin. One particular issue which drew ideological divisions through the colony was that of polyamorous relationships, or the practice of "free love", within members of the colony. Ruskinites opposed to these beliefs brought harsh criticism down on those who harbored free love sympathies, which were in linked to anarchist currents that had been growing within the colony. This could be traced to Alfred Edward's editorial slant towards anarchism during his time as editor of The Coming Nation.

== Georgia ==
The colony eventually became mired in constant litigation over issues of property, with charter members who were now being pushed out of Ruskin seeking to dismantle the group through legal means. The final auction of the Ruskin Colony site at Cave Mills, and most of the communal property, left the remaining members with only a fraction of what they had spent five years struggling to build. The 240 members moved what they did have, which still included the newspaper and the printing apparatus for it, 613 miles on a chartered train to their new home in Georgia, where they merged with the Duke Colony in Ware County and formed the Ruskin Commonwealth.

However, after its first year in Georgia, the number of colonists dropped by half. The new settlement, an old lumber mill, was not surrounded by the fertile land and good sources of water that the previous location had. Ruskinites were plagued with disease, unprofitable business ventures, and a continual slide into poverty that eventually led to the auction of the property by the county sheriff to settle its debts. The Ruskin Commonwealth was effectively disbanded in the autumn of 1901.

== Florida ==
The Ruskin Commongood Society platted Ruskin, Florida on February 19, 1910.

== See also ==
- Ruskin Colleges
