= Ruskin, Florida =

- Census-designated place
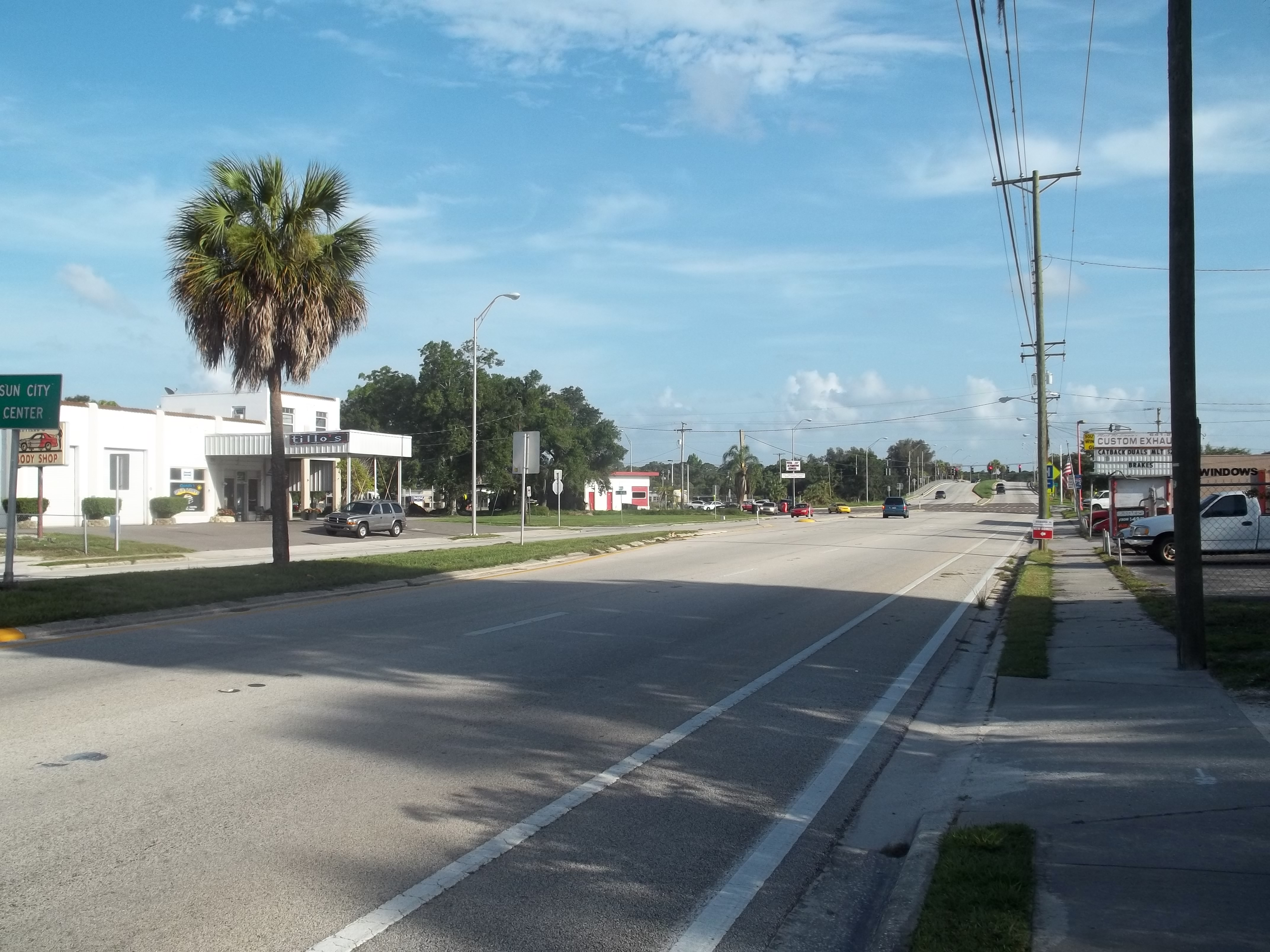

- Location in Hillsborough County and the state of Florida
- Coordinates: 27°42′53″N 82°26′1″W
- Country: United States
- State: Florida
- County: Hillsborough
- Established: August 7, 1908
- Named for: John Ruskin

Area
  - Total: 19.53 sq mi (50.59 km^{2})
  - Land: 18.19 sq mi (47.11 km^{2})
  - Water: 1.34 sq mi (3.48 km^{2})
- Elevation: 3.3 ft (1 m)

Population (2020)
  - Total: 28,620
  - Density: 1,573.3/sq mi (607.46/km^{2})
- Time zone: UTC-5 (Eastern (EST))
  - Summer (DST): UTC-4 (EDT)
- ZIP Codes: 33570-33573, 33575
- Area code: 813
- FIPS code: 12-62275
- GNIS feature ID: 0290065

Ruskin is an unincorporated census-designated place in Hillsborough County, Florida, United States. As of the 2020 census, Ruskin had a population of 28,620. The area was part of the chiefdom of the Uzita at the time of the Hernando de Soto expedition in 1539. The community was founded August 7, 1908, on the shores of the Little Manatee River. It was developed by Dr. George McAnelly Miller, an attorney and professor at Ruskin College in Trenton, Missouri, and Addie Dickman Miller. It is named after the essayist and social critic John Ruskin. Miller established the short-lived Ruskin College. It was one of the Ruskin Colleges.

== History ==
The town and college were named after the English writer and social reformist John Ruskin. Ruskin, a utopian, founded the Guild of St George, a celebration of workmanship that underpinned the Arts and Crafts movement of William Morris. Ruskin was a passionate educator.

In 1907, Dr. George McAnelly Miller, a former Chicago prosecuting attorney and professor, and former president of Ruskin College in Trenton, Missouri, relocated his family to the area, along with his brother-in-law Albert Peter Dickman's family. They purchased land and started to set up homes, a sawmill, and a school. Addie Dickman Miller, Dr. Miller's wife, founded a post office on August 7, 1908. This day is recognized as the official founding day of the town. The Ruskin Commongood Society platted Ruskin on February 19, 1910, and filed the plat on March 9, 1910, in the Hillsborough County Court House, with lots for the college, the business district, two parks, and for the founding families, with only white people allowed to own or lease land in the community. Albert Dickman's house, finished in 1910, on the banks of the Little Manatee River, is one of the few structures left standing from the founding of Ruskin.

The Millers began a new Ruskin College in 1910, with Dr. Miller serving as president and Adeline Miller serving as Vice President. Continuing with the college's former practices, students worked a portion of each day as part of their education and as a way to pay for tuition and board. It offered three years of preparatory classes, after which students could attend the college, taking classes in art, drama, language, literature, music, shorthand, social sciences, and speech. At the peak of the college's prosperity it had 160 students.

By 1913, the community had a cooperative general store, a canning factory, a telephone system, an electric plant supplying electricity to both public and private buildings, a weekly paper, and regular boat freight and passenger service to Tampa. With the onset of World War I, most students went to the war in Europe and the college closed its doors. In 1918, a fire destroyed the college, sparing only the Millers' house. Dr. Miller died in August 1919.

At this time U.S. Route 41 was only a 9-foot-wide (2.7 m) shell road paid for by a $30,000 local bond issue (equivalent to $416,000 in 2025). Because of the growing importance of truck farming, these roads and others were built to facilitate the transportation of produce to local markets throughout the 1920s. The railroad track connected Ruskin to the Seaboard Air Line Railroad line in 1913. On the eve of the college's demise in 1918, Ruskin had a population of 200 Ruskinites, as they are called. The majority of people appeared to have been truck growers. These residents supported a sawmill, a turpentine still, a syrup factory, a blacksmith, a newspaper, a lawyer, two carpenters, and three general stores. Rachel W. Billings served as postmaster and as the Universalist minister. With this foundation, it is not surprising that even with the destruction of the college the colony survived.

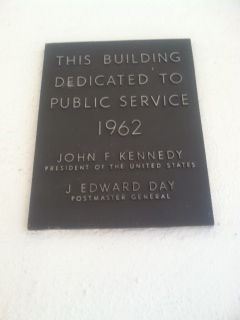
Dedication plaque at Ruskin Post Office, 1962

In 1925, Ruskin's population remained at 200. It had six hotels, two sawmills, one turpentine still, a public library, the Ruskin Telephone Company, four groceries, one garage, a well driller, two restaurants, a dry goods dealer, a carpenter, and a number of fruit and truck growers. Some of the fields had been cultivated, and tomatoes, cabbages, onions and other crops were being raised. There was a nursery established for ornamentals. Thousands of palms were ready for market, and streets were being graded in certain portions of the town that lay off the highway. The community's social life included four or five clubs organized by women, ranging from the Woman's Twentieth Century Club to the League of Women Voters. A new school was erected, as well as a church. With the road developments auto service was provided to Brandon, Tampa, and Wimauma.

In 1930 Ruskin's population had reached 709, consisting of 395 males and 314 females. Despite the deed restrictions against African Americans owning or leasing property, 140 black people resided in Ruskin. The rest of the population was white, of whom 514 were native and 52 were foreign-born. Three companies operated in Ruskin in 1935 despite the Depression and a drop to 600 residents: Florida Power & Light Company; Ruskin Telephone, Electric Light and Power Company, Inc.; and Ruskin Trailer Company.

Because of its agricultural roots, the town weathered the Depression. The soil of Ruskin farms is especially adapted to growing tomatoes. There is a large area of muck land underlaid with marl in this region. The marl base allows irrigation of crops without loss of fertilizer, as the marl prevents the fertilizer from washing too deep into the soil. Ruskin is favored with numerous artesian wells. Due to the rapid growth of tomato culture and a cooperative arrangement among Ruskin farmers, the town was again a thriving community. It had a canning plant which employed 65 workers, a community hall, and a modern schoolhouse. As part of an attempt to attract visitors to Ruskin and to celebrate the area's agricultural richness, the community instituted the annual springtime Ruskin Tomato Festival in 1935 where vegetables were displayed and the community's most popular woman was voted as queen. The festival still takes place every year in May.

With many Ruskin residents working in Tampa during World War II, people from Tampa began hearing of the benefits of the rural community. Shortly after the war, Ruskin slowly became more and more suburban as people not related to the agricultural business moved into the community.

In 1960, Ruskin was still very rural. Agriculture dominated Ruskin throughout the 1970s, but its influence began to wane. The greater Ruskin area's population reached 17,000 by 1975, many of whom were not farmers, but suburbanites. By 1982, Ruskin produced approximately 3,000 acres (1,200 ha) of tomatoes a year, and one of the world's largest tomato-packing houses operated in nearby Apollo Beach. However, flower farms, phosphate, real estate, and tropical fish farms also became important economic engines for Ruskin that began encroaching upon farmland. Despite this, farmers grew approximately $15 million worth of produce yearly in the late 1980s.

Poor crop yields in the mid- to late 1980s drove some farmers to the wall. Many borrowed money, sometimes as much as $500,000, against their land to plant their crops. Consequently, many farmers were forced out of business, and others chose to leave farming forever. Due to the impact of the North American Free Trade Agreement in the 1990s which allowed Mexican tomatoes to flood the U.S. market and with ever-increasing water restrictions, tomato acreage continued to decline. Less than half the number of acres planted with tomatoes in the early 1990s were planted in 1997. The housing boom of the first decade of the 21st century turned most of the tomato and orange plantations into new housing development, bringing thousands of new inhabitants to the area.

The South County Coalition for Community Concerns (SCCCC) established in 1984 was a Ruskin-based Coalition comprising public and private health and human service organizations, government agencies, schools, churches and concerned citizens from South County. The history of the SCCCC (1980-2002) outlines, programs, celebrations and mutual support to bring a better quality of life to people of rural south Hillsborough County.

By 1990, changes to the downtown had occurred. The end of the traditional Ruskin Days parade (due to rising costs) and a great fire that wiped out the popular Thriftway supermarket and adjacent furniture, hardware and MC Topps department stores changed the landscape of the town center.

At present, Ruskin continues to grow with new commerce and housing developments. U.S. Route 41 is now a four-lane road connecting Ruskin to Tampa, as does Interstate 75, which has an exit at Ruskin. It had a very active chamber of commerce until 2011 when it merged with the Apollo Beach Chamber to become the South Shore Chamber of Commerce and moved from Ruskin to Apollo Beach.

Ruskin is the seat of the South Hillsborough County Government Center and has a branch of the Hillsborough County Public Library System. In 2009, the Dickman family donated the land where the new Ruskin Campus of Hillsborough Community College was erected, across the street from Earl J. Lennard High School.

== Geography ==
Ruskin is located in south-central Hillsborough County, on the north side of the Little Manatee River. It is bordered to the north by Apollo Beach and to the east by Sun City Center. U.S. Route 41 passes through the center of town, leading north 10 miles (16 km) to Gibsonton and southwest 20 miles (32 km) to Bradenton. Interstate 75 runs along the eastern edge of Ruskin, with access from Exit 240 (State Road 674/College Avenue). I-75 leads north 16 miles (26 km) to Brandon and south 30 miles (48 km) to Sarasota. Downtown Tampa is 24 miles (39 km) to the north via I-75 and the Selmon Expressway.

According to the United States Census Bureau, the Ruskin CDP has a total area of 19.5 square miles (50.6 km^{2}), of which 18.0 square miles (46.7 km^{2}) are land and 1.5 square miles (3.9 km^{2}), or 7.80%, are water.

=== Climate ===
Climate data for Ruskin, Tampa, 1991–2020 normals, extremes 1976–present
Month	Jan	Feb	Mar	Apr	May	Jun	Jul	Aug	Sep	Oct	Nov	Dec	Year
Record high °F (°C)	87 (31)	88 (31)	92 (33)	95 (35)	100 (38)	99 (37)	98 (37)	100 (38)	96 (36)	95 (35)	92 (33)	88 (31)	100 (38)
Mean maximum °F (°C)	82.9 (28.3)	84.3 (29.1)	86.7 (30.4)	89.8 (32.1)	93.3 (34.1)	94.9 (34.9)	95.0 (35.0)	94.9 (34.9)	93.7 (34.3)	91.2 (32.9)	86.7 (30.4)	83.6 (28.7)	95.8 (35.4)
Mean daily maximum °F (°C)	71.8 (22.1)	74.7 (23.7)	78.3 (25.7)	82.8 (28.2)	87.6 (30.9)	90.0 (32.2)	90.9 (32.7)	91.0 (32.8)	89.8 (32.1)	85.3 (29.6)	78.8 (26.0)	74.2 (23.4)	82.9 (28.3)
Daily mean °F (°C)	61.2 (16.2)	64.0 (17.8)	67.5 (19.7)	72.3 (22.4)	77.2 (25.1)	81.0 (27.2)	82.2 (27.9)	82.4 (28.0)	81.2 (27.3)	75.9 (24.4)	68.5 (20.3)	63.9 (17.7)	73.1 (22.8)
Mean daily minimum °F (°C)	50.7 (10.4)	53.2 (11.8)	56.7 (13.7)	61.7 (16.5)	66.8 (19.3)	72.0 (22.2)	73.5 (23.1)	73.9 (23.3)	72.6 (22.6)	66.6 (19.2)	58.2 (14.6)	53.6 (12.0)	63.3 (17.4)
Mean minimum °F (°C)	32.5 (0.3)	36.3 (2.4)	41.1 (5.1)	48.7 (9.3)	57.4 (14.1)	67.4 (19.7)	70.1 (21.2)	70.5 (21.4)	66.9 (19.4)	53.3 (11.8)	43.0 (6.1)	37.1 (2.8)	30.9 (−0.6)
Record low °F (°C)	21 (−6)	24 (−4)	27 (−3)	37 (3)	46 (8)	50 (10)	65 (18)	64 (18)	56 (13)	40 (4)	35 (2)	22 (−6)	21 (−6)
Average precipitation inches (mm)	2.66 (68)	2.21 (56)	2.96 (75)	2.74 (70)	3.01 (76)	7.92 (201)	8.16 (207)	8.79 (223)	7.70 (196)	2.86 (73)	2.00 (51)	2.58 (66)	53.59 (1,361)
Average precipitation days (≥ 0.01 in)	7.0	6.9	8.1	7.3	9.4	7.3	4.9	5.1	5.6	7.2	6.5	6.9	82.2
Average relative humidity (%)	67.5	66.4	63.7	65.3	69.7	65.8	60.0	60.5	66.5	65.7	67.4	67.5	65.4
Average dew point °F (°C)	31.3 (−0.4)	35.2 (1.8)	42.6 (5.9)	52.0 (11.1)	61.0 (16.1)	66.6 (19.2)	67.6 (19.8)	66.7 (19.3)	63.3 (17.4)	53.2 (11.8)	43.7 (6.5)	34.7 (1.5)	51.5 (10.8)
Mean monthly sunshine hours	183.5	178.3	227.7	236.0	258.4	297.8	332.4	304.5	246.2	228.1	183.8	173.0	2,849.7
Percentage possible sunshine	58	58	61	61	60	69	76	74	66	65	59	56	64
Average ultraviolet index	3	5	7	9	10	10	10	10	8	6	4	3	7
Source: NOAA (relative humidity, dew point and sun 1961−1990)

== Demographics ==
Historical population
Census	Pop.	Note	%±
1960	1,894		—
1970	2,414		27.5%
1980	5,117		112.0%
1990	6,046		18.2%
2000	8,321		37.6%
2010	17,208		106.8%
2020	28,620		66.3%

=== Racial and ethnic composition ===
Ruskin CDP, Florida – Racial and ethnic composition Note: the US Census treats Hispanic/Latino as an ethnic category. This table excludes Latinos from the racial categories and assigns them to a separate category. Hispanics/Latinos may be of any race.
Race / Ethnicity (NH = Non-Hispanic)	Pop 2000	Pop 2010	Pop 2020	% 2000	% 2010	% 2020
White alone (NH)	5,050	7,884	10,303	60.69%	45.82%	36.00%
Black or African American alone (NH)	75	1,470	5,464	0.90%	8.54%	19.09%
Native American or Alaska Native alone (NH)	30	42	82	0.36%	0.24%	0.29%
Asian alone (NH)	36	212	475	0.43%	1.23%	1.66%
Native Hawaiian or Pacific Islander alone (NH)	11	9	32	0.13%	0.05%	0.11%
Other race alone (NH)	6	37	180	0.07%	0.22%	0.63%
Mixed race or Multiracial (NH)	57	177	970	0.69%	1.03%	3.39%
Hispanic or Latino (any race)	3,056	7,377	11,114	36.73%	42.87%	38.83%
Total	8,321	17,208	28,620	100.00%	100.00%	100.00%

=== 2020 census ===
As of the 2020 census, Ruskin had a population of 28,620. The median age was 34.2 years. 28.4% of residents were under the age of 18 and 10.6% of residents were 65 years of age or older. For every 100 females there were 96.8 males, and for every 100 females age 18 and over there were 94.1 males age 18 and over.

98.2% of residents lived in urban areas, while 1.8% lived in rural areas.

There were 9,343 households in Ruskin, of which 42.2% had children under the age of 18 living in them. Of all households, 51.7% were married-couple households, 15.4% were households with a male householder and no spouse or partner present, and 23.4% were households with a female householder and no spouse or partner present. About 17.9% of all households were made up of individuals and 6.1% had someone living alone who was 65 years of age or older.

There were 10,339 housing units, of which 9.6% were vacant. The homeowner vacancy rate was 2.7% and the rental vacancy rate was 8.6%.

Racial composition as of the 2020 census
Race	Number	Percent
White	13,112	45.8%
Black or African American	5,745	20.1%
American Indian and Alaska Native	220	0.8%
Asian	496	1.7%
Native Hawaiian and Other Pacific Islander	36	0.1%
Some other race	3,958	13.8%
Two or more races	5,053	17.7%

=== 2010 census ===
As of the 2010 US Census, there were 17,208 people living in the community. The racial makeup of the community was 71.71% White, 9.12% Black or African American, 0.33% Native American, 1.33% Asian, 0.06% Pacific Islander, 15.28% from other races, and 2.17% from two or more races. Hispanic or Latino of any race were 42.87% of the population.

There were 2,963 households, 29.8% of which had children under the age of 18 present, 53.6% were married couples living together, 10.5% had a female householder with no spouse present, and 30.0% were non-familial/roommate arrangements; single individuals comprised 23.9% of households, and 11.6% were single senior citizens (aged 65 or older). The average household size was 2.79 individuals; the average family size was 3.28 members.

Within the community, the population was spread out; 26.5% were under the age of 18, 9.6% were from 18-24, 26.8% from 25-44, 21.1% from 45-64, and 16.1% were 65 years of age or older. The median age was 35 years. For every 100 females, there were 104.1 males. For every 100 females above age 18, there were 102.9 males.

The median income for a household in the community was $28,228, and the median income for a family was $32,404. Males had a median income of $25,787 versus $20,817 for females. The per capita income for the community was $12,943. About 10.6% of families and 17.1% of the population were below the poverty line, including 20.9% of those under age 18 and 11.7% of those age 65 or over.

Recognizing the needs of Latino families, especially those of migrant farm workers, the Redlands Christian Migrant Association provides childcare services, community outreach, and adult and continuing education opportunities, as well as assisting in the Migrant Head Start program.

== Economy ==
=== Amazon ===
Governor Rick Scott and Amazon announced, in 2013, that Amazon would create 3,000 new jobs in Florida. At more than one million square feet, the Amazon warehouse is nearly ten times the size of the average Home Depot store. The first item, a character doll of Anna (from the animated film Frozen), arrived at the warehouse on September 18, 2014. In 2014, Amazon spent $46 million on Kiva robots for the Ruskin facility. In 2016, Amazon announced it would add an on-site training center for employees to enroll in college courses.

== Arts and culture ==
=== The Big Draw ===
The annual BIG DRAW-Ruskin began in 2008 to mark the 100th anniversary of Ruskin as a community whose founders were influenced by the writings and philosophy of John Ruskin. It is inspired by and linked to the international Campaign for Drawing first initiated in Great Britain to honor John Ruskin. THE BIG DRAW-Ruskin celebrated the vision of Ruskin who believed in drawing as a tool for understanding and knowledge and promoted the importance of the arts in education and community life.

The 2008 Ruskin Community Mural was drawn by artist Michael Parker and The Amazing Community Mural Team. Parker with assistant Dave Bush recruited a community group of Ruskin teens and adults. The intergenerational group engaged in an intense collaboration of research, photography, and discussion of possible ideas. The final design concept was based on John Ruskin's social ideal that human happiness requires the mix of the head, heart and hand. Mural imagery includes references to historic Ruskin, the agricultural and environmentally sensitive setting across the bay from urban centers, development and movement to future possibility. Maynard Clark donated the mural site.

The 2009 Community Mural-in-the-Round Project was coordinated by Josette Urso and the mural was painted on the Mary & Martha House building. Both the 2008 and 2009 projects were commissioned by the SouthShore Arts Council and funded by grants from the John Crawford Fund of the Community Foundation of Greater Sun City Center.

== Points of interest ==
There are several locations in and near Ruskin some of which have been included in the National Register of Historic Places.

- A. P. Dickman House
- Cockroach Bay Aquatic Preserve
- Cockroach Key
- Firehouse Cultural Center
- Fountain of Youth
- Little Manatee River State Park
- Trooper Kenneth E. Flynt Hwy. Highway 41 in Hillsborough County from Big Bend Rd (CR 672) to Little Manatee River designated by the Florida Senate in Memory of Trooper Flynt killed in the line of duty.
- Leisey Shell Pits located in Ruskin by the Little Manatee River, is perhaps the world's largest ice-age fossil deposit, yielding tens of thousands of bones and several hundred species of Ice Age mammals.
- George McA. Miller House

== Government ==
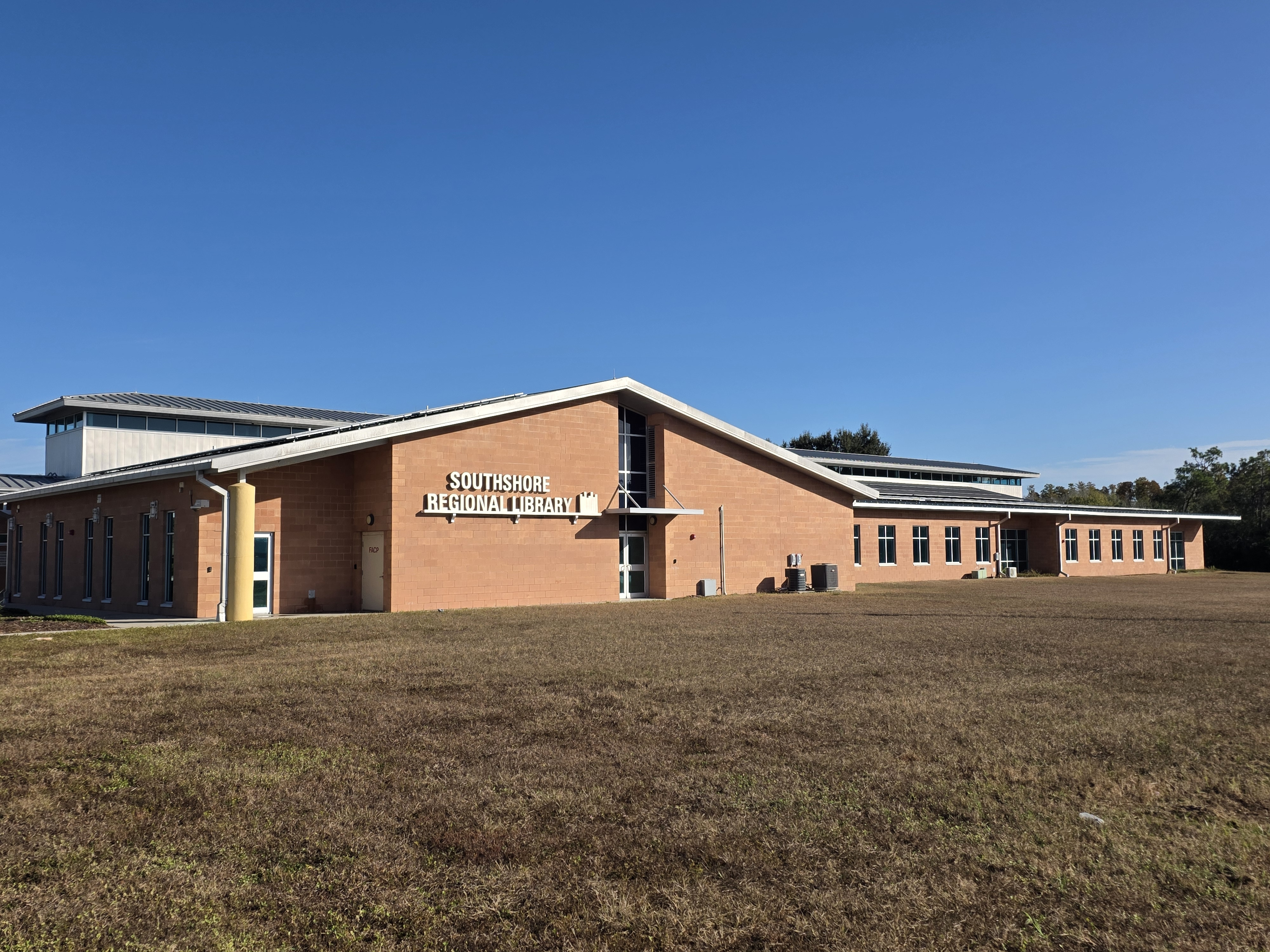
SouthShore Regional Library

The area is a part of unincorporated Hillsborough County. It is administered by the Board of County Commissioners. Ruskin is the location of the SouthShore Regional Service Center for Hillsborough County. The SouthShore Community Resource Center, administered by the County, provides social services in Ruskin.

There are two branches of the Tampa–Hillsborough County Public Library System in Ruskin: the SouthShore Regional Library and the Ruskin Library. Residents may use any library in the system. Library cards are free to residents.

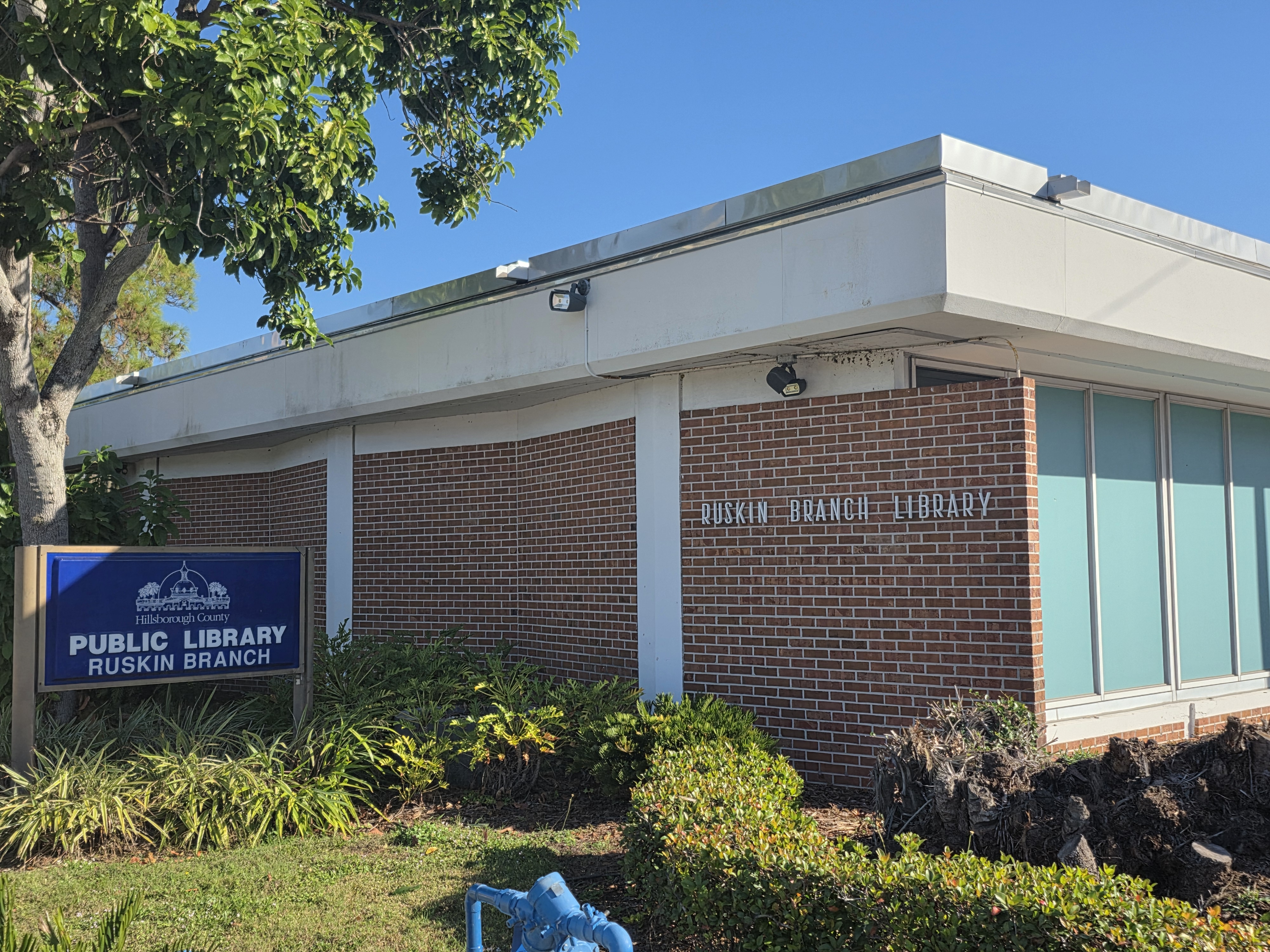
Ruskin Branch Library

Ruskin is also home for the National Weather Service (NWS) Forecast Office labeled "Tampa Bay Area - Ruskin". This forecast office is responsible for the area from Levy County in the north to Lee County in the south and extending in as far inland as Sumter, Polk, Hardee, DeSoto, and Highlands Counties. It also is responsible for weather forecasts and severe storm warnings for the western Florida coastal waters from Cedar Key to Bonita Beach and out 60 nautical miles (110 km; 69 mi) which includes Tampa Bay and Charlotte Harbor. There is an NEXRAD weather radar site featuring dual polarization doppler radar and aviation terminal forecasts are also done at this office.

== Education ==
It is in the Hillsborough County School District.

In 2014, the J. Vince Thompson Elementary School opened in Ruskin. It is the first LEED-designated school in Hillsborough County. The campus adjoins Lennard High School and Hillsborough Community College SouthShore campus.

The Hillsborough Community College SouthShore campus is located in Ruskin. It is LEED-certified Gold. It includes the Lennard Collegiate Academy.

On October 30, 2014, Gannon University, based from Erie, Pennsylvania, announced that it would offer graduate health professional programs at a new campus in Ruskin. The site was chosen to meet increased demand for high-quality graduate education in disciplines that served the rapidly expanding health care sector of the Florida economy.

== Media ==
=== WPHX—101.9 FM The Phoenix ===
The Phoenix is the Ruskin community radio station, WPHX-LP (101.9 FM), transmitting from the Firehouse Cultural Center in Ruskin, which began broadcasting on August 17, 2015.

=== Observer News ===
In 1963, Evan Mixon purchased a weekly shopper and began a Ruskin family business that grew to include The Observer News (which had begun in 1958) and combined the two papers into The Shopper & Observer. The Observer News, a weekly newspaper reports news of Ruskin and wider South Hillsborough County has been a locally owned source of community information for many years.

== Notable people ==
- Clarence Anglin and John Anglin, bank robbers, escaped from Alcatraz in 1962.
- Aaron Carter, singer
- Leslie Carter, singer
- Nick Carter, musician, Backstreet Boys
- Willa Ford, singer and actress
- Kathleen de la Peña McCook. library science professor
- Addie Dickman Miller co-founder of Ruskin College
- Diontae Johnson, American Football wide receiver for the Carolina Panthers

== See also ==
- Ruskin Colleges
