= Avalon, Missouri =

Unincorporated community in Missouri, U.S.

Avalon
- Unincorporated community Census designated place
- Location within Missouri
- Coordinates: 39°39′33″N 93°26′30″W
- Country: United States
- State: Missouri
- County: Livingston
- Established: 1869

Avalon is an unincorporated community and census-designated place (CDP) in southern Livingston County, Missouri, United States. It is located on Missouri Route H, approximately one mile east of U.S. Route 65 and ten miles southeast of Chillicothe. As of the 2020 census, Avalon had a population of 83.

Avalon was platted in 1869. The community's name is a transfer from Avallon, in France. A post office called Avalon was established in 1872, and remained in operation until 1985.

== demographics ==
Avalon first appeared as a census designated place in the 2020 U.S. census.
