= Glen Ellyn, Illinois =

Glen Ellyn
- Village
- Village of Glen Ellyn
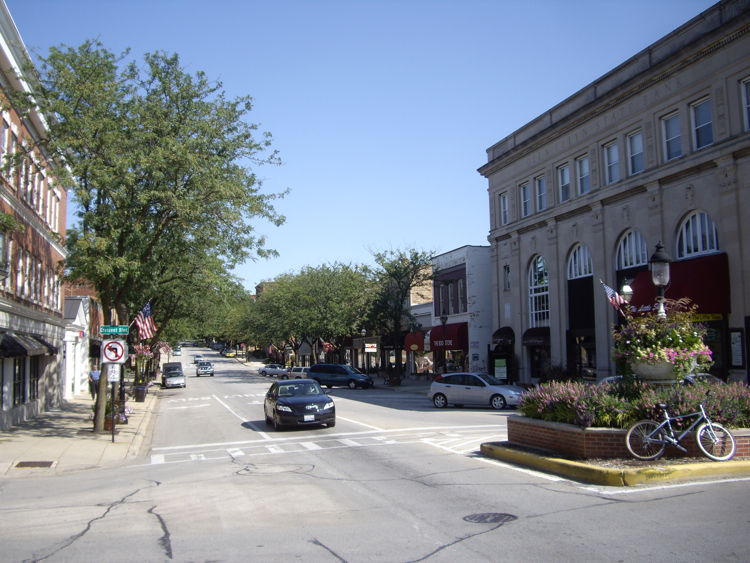
- Glen Ellyn Main Street

- Flag
- Motto: "Village of Volunteers"
- Location of Glen Ellyn in DuPage County, Illinois.
- Coordinates: 41°52′36″N 88°03′49″W
- Country: United States
- State: Illinois
- County: DuPage
- Township: Milton
- Settled: 1834
- Incorporated: May 10, 1896

Government
  - Type: Council–manager

Area
  - Total: 7.05 sq mi (18.26 km^{2})
  - Land: 6.89 sq mi (17.84 km^{2})
  - Water: 0.16 sq mi (0.42 km^{2}) 2.36%
- Elevation: 781 ft (238 m)

Population (2020)
  - Total: 28,846
  - Density: 4,187.3/sq mi (1,616.73/km^{2})
- Up 1.7% from 2000

Standard of living
  - Per capita income: $73,337 (median family: $133,346)
  - Home value: $544,521 (median: 2025))
- Time zone: UTC-6 (CST)
  - Summer (DST): UTC-5 (CDT)
- ZIP Codes: 60137, 60820, and 60821
- Area codes: 630 and 331
- FIPS code: 17-29756
- GNIS feature ID: 2398972
- Website: glenellyn.org

Glen Ellyn is a village in DuPage County, Illinois, United States. A suburb located 24 miles (39 km) due west of downtown Chicago, the village has a population of 28,846 as of the 2020 Census.

== History ==
Glen Ellyn, like the neighboring town to the east, Lombard, had its genesis in an 1833 claim by two brothers from the Finger Lakes region of New York, Morgan and Ralph Babcock. The two claimed property in a large stand of timber near present-day St. Charles Road and the East Branch of the DuPage River. The brothers also arranged for a claim for their New York neighbor Deacon Winslow Churchill, who arrived in 1834 along with some of his adult children and their families. The nascent settlement became known as Babcock's Grove, and it included property currently part of both Glen Ellyn and Lombard.

Up the trail from the river to the west was a five-cornered intersection. In 1835, Daniel Fish built a cabin there, and other settlers followed. By the 1840s the intersection was called Fish's Corners and held a general store, blacksmith's forge, shops selling or repairing wagons and harnesses, and a Baptist church.

Moses Stacy, a soldier in the War of 1812, arrived in 1835 and built a house south of Fish's Corners. In 1846, Stacy built at the five corners an inn, Stacy's Tavern, to serve as a halfway stop between Chicago and the Fox River Valley and a probable stop for Galena, Illinois stagecoaches on their way to Rockford, Illinois. Stacy's Tavern, now a historical monument, stands at what is now the intersection of Geneva Road and Main Street.

In 1849, construction of the Galena and Chicago Union Railroad through Glen Ellyn was finished. The railroad was about a mile south of the corners. At first, trains running through the town on the railway did not stop there. A local landowner, Lewey Quitterfield Newton, made an offer to the railroad company: Newton would provide land for a right-of-way and build a depot and water tank if the railroad would require trains to stop there. The depot that Newton built became known as Newton Station, and the locus of the community shifted to the area around the station.

The first church, a Congregational church, was built in 1862. Many Protestant churches were built in the village in the years to come. It was not until 60 years later that the first Catholic church was built.

The growing settlement went through several names, including Babcock's Grove, DuPage Center, Stacy's Corners, Newton's Station, Danby (after Danby, Vermont, a local landowner's birthplace) and Prospect Park. The current Glen Ellyn is based on the Welsh version of the name of village president Thomas E. Hill's wife Ellen, preceded by glen, referring to the local geography.

The name Glen Ellyn had been adopted by 1889, when village president Hill and businessman Philo Stacy spearheaded a project to create a new lake, called Lake Glen Ellyn (today's Lake Ellyn), by having a dam built in a nearby stream.

In 1890, residents discovered mineral springs near the village. This contributed to Glen Ellyn advertising itself as Chicago's newest suburb and health resort, soon followed by the Village of Glen Ellyn being officially incorporated on May 10, 1892. The large Lake Glen Ellyn Hotel opened in 1892, the same year much of the business district was destroyed by fire. Fourteen years later, the hotel was struck by lightning and burned to the ground.

The village's all-volunteer fire department was created in 1907. By the end of the 20th century, it was the last all-volunteer fire department in DuPage County.

By World War I, Glen Oak Country Club served the Oak Park and Glen Ellyn communities, and in 1922 the first Glenbard high school was built.

== Geography ==
The Village of Glen Ellyn is a suburb of Chicago, and it lies about 24 miles (39 km) due west of downtown Chicago.

According to the 2021 census gazetteer files, Glen Ellyn has a total area of 7.01 square miles (18.16 km^{2}), of which 6.85 square miles (17.74 km^{2}) (or 97.70%) is land and 0.16 square miles (0.41 km^{2}) (or 2.30%) is water.

== Demographics ==
Historical population
Census	Pop.	Note	%±
1890	473		—
1900	793		67.7%
1910	1,763		122.3%
1920	2,851		61.7%
1930	7,680		169.4%
1940	8,055		4.9%
1950	9,524		18.2%
1960	15,972		67.7%
1970	21,909		37.2%
1980	23,691		8.1%
1990	24,944		5.3%
2000	26,999		8.2%
2010	27,450		1.7%
2020	28,846		5.1%
U.S. Decennial Census

=== Racial and ethnic composition ===
Glen Ellyn village, Illinois – Racial and ethnic composition Note: the US Census treats Hispanic/Latino as an ethnic category. This table excludes Latinos from the racial categories and assigns them to a separate category. Hispanics/Latinos may be of any race.
Race / Ethnicity (NH = Non-Hispanic)	Pop 2000	Pop 2010	Pop 2020	% 2000	% 2010	% 2020
White alone (NH)	23,476	22,667	22,277	86.95%	82.58%	77.23%
Black or African American alone (NH)	570	786	947	2.11%	2.86%	3.28%
Native American or Alaska Native alone (NH)	26	20	10	0.10%	0.07%	0.03%
Asian alone (NH)	1,276	1,774	2,341	4.73%	6.46%	8.12%
Pacific Islander alone (NH)	2	3	8	0.01%	0.01%	0.03%
Other race alone (NH)	27	42	56	0.10%	0.15%	0.19%
Mixed race or Multiracial (NH)	347	357	1,051	1.29%	1.30%	3.64%
Hispanic or Latino (any race)	1,275	1,801	2,156	4.72%	6.56%	7.47%
Total	26,999	27,450	28,846	100.00%	100.00%	100.00%

=== 2020 census ===
As of the 2020 census, Glen Ellyn had a population of 28,846. The population density was 4,114.39 inhabitants per square mile (1,588.57/km^{2}). There were 10,749 households and 7,529 families in the village. 36.0% of households had children under the age of 18 living in them. Of all households, 59.8% were married-couple households, 12.7% were households with a male householder and no spouse or partner present, and 24.3% were households with a female householder and no spouse or partner present. About 25.1% of all households were made up of individuals and 12.7% had someone living alone who was 65 years of age or older. The average household size was 3.17 and the average family size was 2.58.

The median age was 40.0 years. 26.1% of residents were under the age of 18 and 16.5% of residents were 65 years of age or older. For every 100 females there were 93.5 males, and for every 100 females age 18 and over there were 90.1 males age 18 and over.

100.0% of residents lived in urban areas, while 0.0% lived in rural areas.

There were 11,283 housing units at an average density of 1,609.33 per square mile (621.37/km^{2}), of which 4.7% were vacant. The homeowner vacancy rate was 1.5% and the rental vacancy rate was 7.2%.

=== Income and poverty ===
The median income for a household in the village was $118,208, and the median income for a family was $169,358. Males had a median income of $90,561 versus $44,196 for females. The per capita income for the village was $65,328. About 2.2% of families and 4.6% of the population were below the poverty line, including 2.3% of those under age 18 and 1.7% of those age 65 or over.

== Economy ==
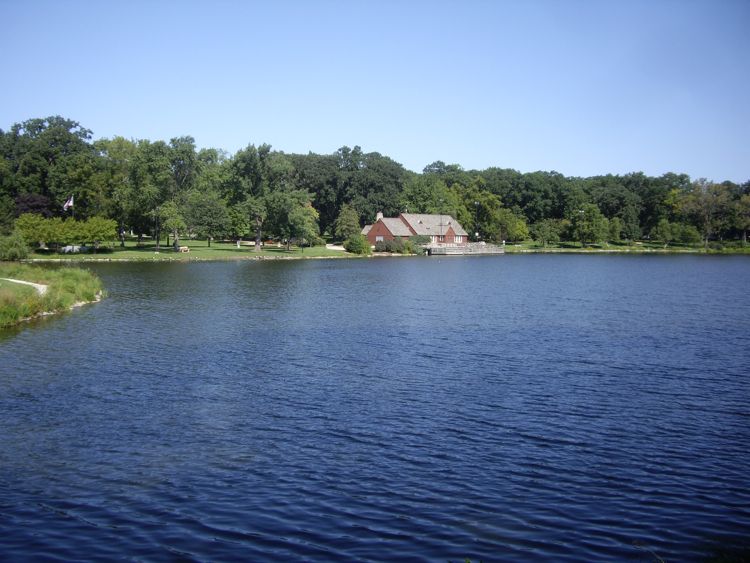
Lake Ellyn

According to Glen Ellyn's 2021 Comprehensive Annual Financial Report, the top employers in the city are:

#	Employer	# of Employees
1	College of DuPage	3837
2	School District 41	549
3	School District 87	485
4	Village of Glen Ellyn	460
5	Duly Health and Care	275

== Transportation ==
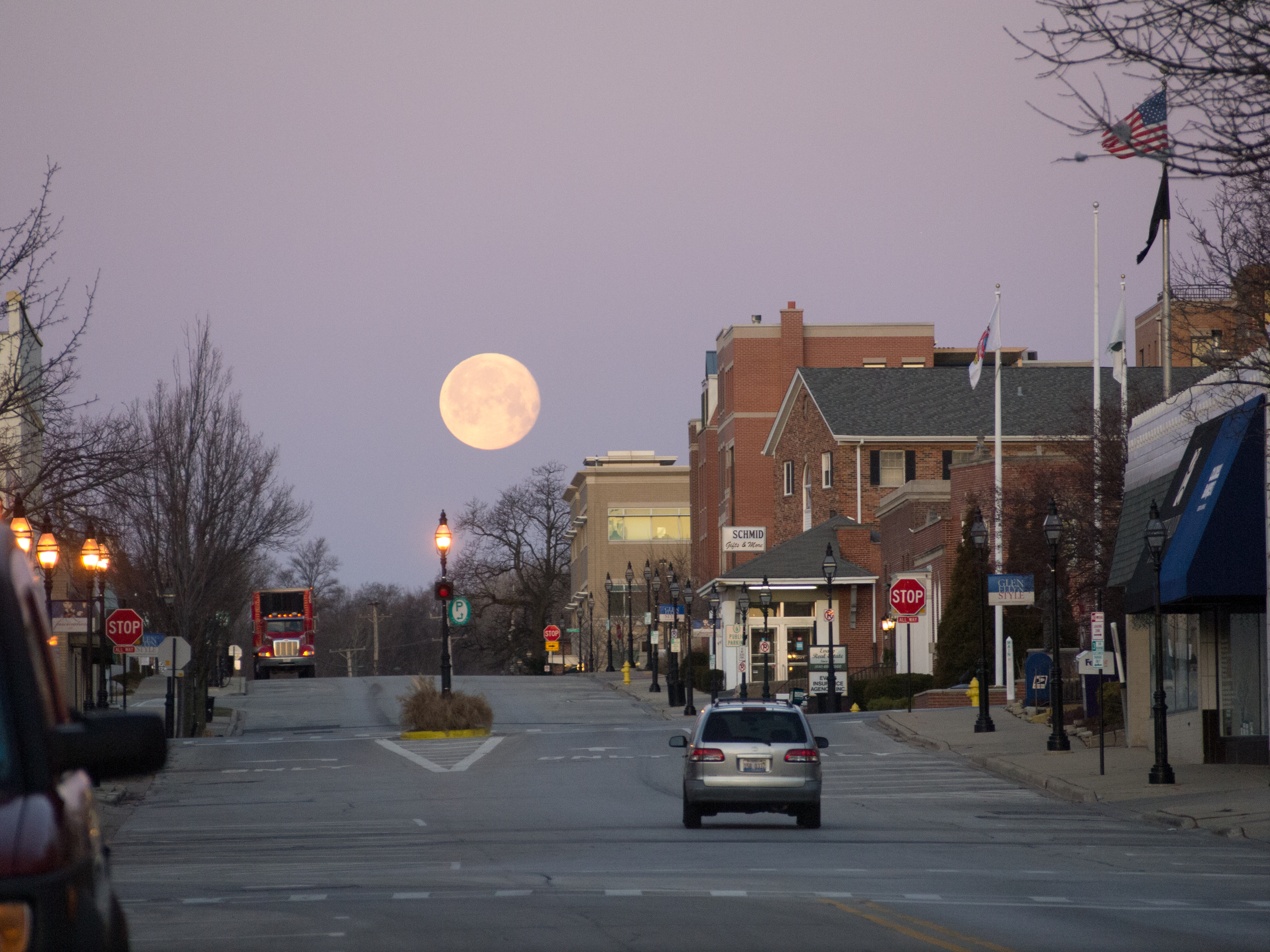
Pennsylvania Avenue looking west

Glen Ellyn is served by the Metra Union Pacific West Line. The Glen Ellyn station is located at 551 Crescent Blvd, near the heart of the downtown business district. The station is located 22.4 miles (36.0 km) away from Ogilvie Transportation Center, the eastern terminus of the West Line.

Glen Ellyn is served by Pace bus routes 714, 715, and 301 passing through the village on Roosevelt Road.

The Illinois Prairie Path bicycle trail bisects the village and the Great Western Trail (Illinois) passes through the northern edge.

At the east end of the village, Roosevelt Road provides access onto Interstate 355.

== Glen Ellyn Park District ==
Glen Ellyn Park District was established on November 3, 1919, as a government agency for the community of Glen Ellyn. The facility was made to provide recreational activities such as, sports, dance, childcare and more. The park district provides more than 700 programs and is open all year round. The park district's year is divided into three seasons: Fall, Winter and Spring/Summer. It has 30 parks that are maintained for both recreational use and programmed events like youth football and softball. The district has one outdoor aquatic facility Sunset Pool, four recreation buildings, 23 multipurpose parks and playgrounds and two lakes, including Ackerman Sports & Fitness Center and the Lake Ellyn Boathouse. Annual events include Taste of Glen Ellyn and a Fourth of July firework show and parade.

== Education ==
=== Higher education ===
The main campus of College of DuPage is located in Glen Ellyn. Among its alumni are the comedian John Belushi and his actor brother James Belushi.

=== Public schools ===
Glen Ellyn's primary schools are part of Glen Ellyn School District 41 and Community Consolidated School District 89. Its high schools are a part of Glenbard Township High School District 87, with the term Glenbard being a blend of Glen Ellyn and Lombard, a village due east of Glen Ellyn.

- High schools
  - Glenbard West High School
  - Glenbard South High School
- Middle schools
  - Glen Crest Middle School
  - Hadley Junior High School
- Elementary schools
  - Abraham Lincoln Elementary School
  - Arbor View Elementary School
  - Benjamin Franklin Elementary School
  - Churchill Elementary School
  - Forest Glen Elementary School
  - Park View Elementary School
  - Westfield Elementary School

=== Private schools ===
- Montessori Academy of Glen Ellyn
- Phillip J. Rock Center and School
- St. James the Apostle Catholic School
- St. Petronille Catholic School
- Maryknoll Montessori School

== Sister cities ==
- Calatayud, Aragón, Spain
- Le Bouscat, Gironde, France

== See also ==
- Glen Oak Country Club
