= Sun City Center, Florida =

- Census-designated place
- Location in Hillsborough County and the state of Florida
- Coordinates: 27°42′43″N 82°21′58″W
- Country: United States
- State: Florida
- County: Hillsborough
- Founded: 1961

Area
  - Total: 16.61 sq mi (43.01 km^{2})
  - Land: 15.76 sq mi (40.82 km^{2})
  - Water: 0.85 sq mi (2.19 km^{2})
- Elevation: 46 ft (14 m)

Population (2020)
  - Total: 30,952
  - Density: 1,964.1/sq mi (758.35/km^{2})
- Time zone: UTC-5 (Eastern (EST))
  - Summer (DST): UTC-4 (EDT)
- ZIP Codes: 33573
- Area code: 813
- FIPS code: 12-69250
- GNIS feature ID: 1853255
- Website: www.suncitycenter.org

Sun City Center is an unincorporated census-designated place (CDP) in southern Hillsborough County, Florida, United States. It is located south of Tampa and north of Sarasota on I-75. As of the 2020 census, the population was 30,952.

== Description ==
Sun City Center is an age-restricted community, which consists of single-family dwellings, duplexes, townhouses, and apartment buildings. It has its own hospital and several nursing home facilities. It is legal to drive golf carts on the wide, palm-lined streets during daylight hours, and most shopping has special parking slots for same. There are about five golf courses, various hobby shops, and an outdoor and two indoor pools in the main clubhouse area. There are clubs for almost any interest or hobby, including ham radio, computers, art, woodworking, photography, sewing, cards, investments, and dancing.

== Geography ==
Sun City Center is located in southern Hillsborough County. It is bordered to the northwest by Apollo Beach, to the northeast by Balm, to the east by Wimauma, and to the west by Ruskin. Interstate 75 forms the northwestern edge of the CDP, with access from Exit 240, Sun City Center Boulevard (State Road 674). U.S. Route 301 forms the eastern edge of the CDP, and the southern edge follows the Little Manatee River. Tampa is 24 miles (39 km) to the north, and Bradenton is 21 miles (34 km) to the southwest via I-75, or 25 miles (40 km) via US-301.

According to the United States Census Bureau, Sun City Center has a total area of 16.6 square miles (43.0 km^{2}), of which 15.8 square miles (40.8 km^{2}) are land and 0.85 square miles (2.2 km^{2}), or 5.20%, are water.

== Library ==
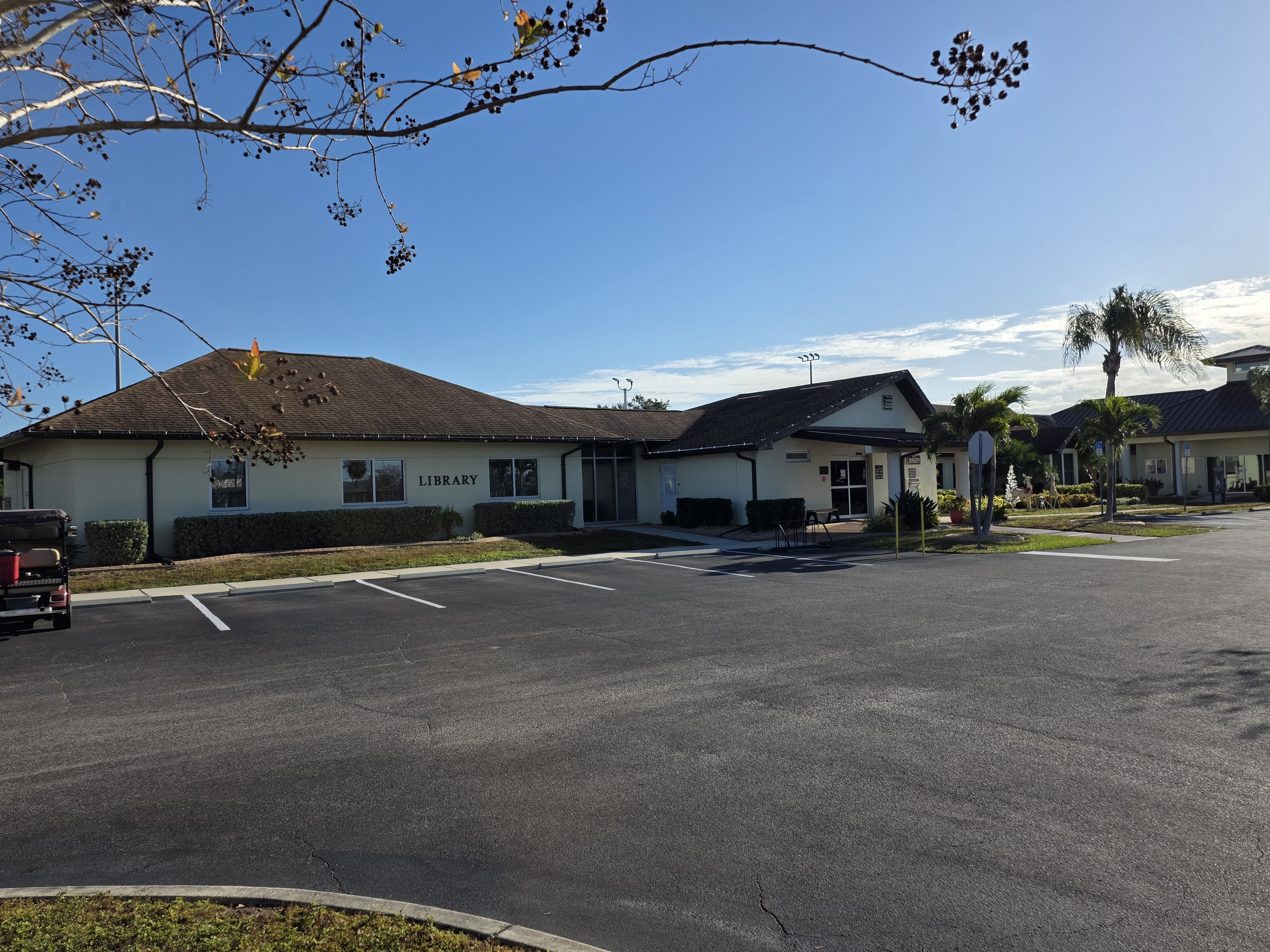
Sun City Community Library

Sun City center has a library has over 32,000 items. It is staffed full time by 1 employee and 3 part time employee and over 40 volunteers. The library itself is not open to the public as it is privately funded and only open to those individuals who are members of the Sun City Center Community Association, Ashton Gardens and Freedom Plaza. They do offer membership to residents of Kings Point at the cost of $24 annually.

The library was established in 1963 by Erma Krauch who made an initial donation of 5000 books. The current building located at 1011 N. Pebble Beach Blvd was donated in 1980 by the WG Development Corporation.

== Demographics ==
Historical population
Census	Pop.	Note	%±
1970	2,143		—
1980	5,605		161.5%
1990	8,326		48.5%
2000	16,321		96.0%
2010	19,258		18.0%
2020	30,952		60.7%

=== Racial and ethnic composition ===
Sun City Center racial composition (Hispanics excluded from racial categories) (NH = Non-Hispanic)
Race	Pop 2010	Pop 2020	% 2010	% 2020
White (NH)	17,968	24,037	93.30%	77.66%
Black or African American (NH)	378	2,595	1.96%	8.38%
Native American or Alaska Native (NH)	16	60	0.08%	0.19%
Asian (NH)	169	551	0.88%	1.78%
Pacific Islander or Native Hawaiian (NH)	7	11	0.04%	0.04%
Some other race (NH)	5	136	0.03%	0.44%
Two or more races/Multiracial (NH)	101	651	0.52%	2.10%
Hispanic or Latino (any race)	614	2,911	3.19%	9.40%
Total	19,258	30,952		

=== 2020 census ===
As of the 2020 census, Sun City Center had a population of 30,952. The median age was 70.4 years. 7.7% of residents were under the age of 18 and 63.8% of residents were 65 years of age or older. For every 100 females there were 78.8 males, and for every 100 females age 18 and over there were 77.2 males age 18 and over.

100.0% of residents lived in urban areas, while 0.0% lived in rural areas.

There were 15,834 households in Sun City Center, of which 9.2% had children under the age of 18 living in them. Of all households, 52.1% were married-couple households, 12.5% were households with a male householder and no spouse or partner present, and 31.4% were households with a female householder and no spouse or partner present. About 35.8% of all households were made up of individuals and 30.2% had someone living alone who was 65 years of age or older. There were 8,037 families residing in the CDP.

There were 18,111 housing units, of which 12.6% were vacant. The homeowner vacancy rate was 3.2% and the rental vacancy rate was 13.7%.

Racial composition as of the 2020 census
Race	Number	Percent
White	24,746	79.9%
Black or African American	2,707	8.7%
American Indian and Alaska Native	78	0.3%
Asian	567	1.8%
Native Hawaiian and Other Pacific Islander	13	0.0%
Some other race	865	2.8%
Two or more races	1,976	6.4%
Hispanic or Latino (of any race)	2,911	9.4%

=== 2010 census ===
As of the 2010 United States census, there were 19,258 people, 11,197 households, and 6,325 families residing in the CDP.

=== 2000 census ===
As of the census of 2000, there were 16,321 people, 9,149 households, and 5,434 families residing in the community. The population density was 1,303.0 inhabitants per square mile (503.1/km^{2}). There were 10,500 housing units at an average density of 838.3 per square mile (323.7/km^{2}). The racial makeup of the community was 98.96% White, 0.13% African American, 0.08% Native American, 0.40% Asian, 0.07% Pacific Islander, 0.14% from other races, and 0.21% from two or more races. Hispanic or Latino of any race were 1.19% of the population.

As of 2000, there were 9,149 households, out of which 0.3% had children under the age of 18 living with them, 57.1% were married couples living together, 1.9% had a female householder with no husband present, and 40.6% were non-families. 38.1% of all households were made up of individuals, and 34.7% had someone living alone who was 65 years of age or older. The average household size was 1.65 and the average family size was 2.05.

In 2000, in the community the population was skewed toward the elderly with 0.4% under the age of 18, 0.2% from 18 to 24, 1.3% from 25 to 44, 15.1% from 45 to 64, and 83.0% who were 65 years of age or older. The median age was 75 years. For every 100 females, there were 74.4 males. For every 100 females age 18 and over, there were 74.2 males.

In 2000, the median income for a household in the community was $38,101, and the median income for a family was $47,570. Males had a median income of $36,786 versus $27,963 for females. The per capita income for the community was $28,222. About 2.2% of families and 4.6% of the population were below the poverty line, including 37.3% of those under age 18 and 3.9% of those age 65 or over.

== Transportation ==
Sun City Center is served primarily by two Hillsborough Area Regional Transit bus lines:

- Line 571 - South County Flex
- Line 75LX - South County Shopper

== Notable people ==
- Thomas P. Maguire, Adjutant General of New York
- Bud Sagendorf, cartoonist of the Thimble Theater comic strip and the Popeye comic books
