= Alice Grey =

Alice Grey may refer to:

- Alice Grey (alleged witch) (died 1612), one of the Pendle witches
- Alice Grey, Countess Grey (died 1944), wife of Albert Grey, 4th Earl Grey

== See also ==
- Alice Gray (1914–1994), American entomologist and origamist
- Alice Gray (science blogger) (born 1992), Welsh science writer
- Alice Gray (portrait), an 1857 oil painting by John Everett Millais
