= Alice Gray (portrait) =

Painting by John Everett Millais

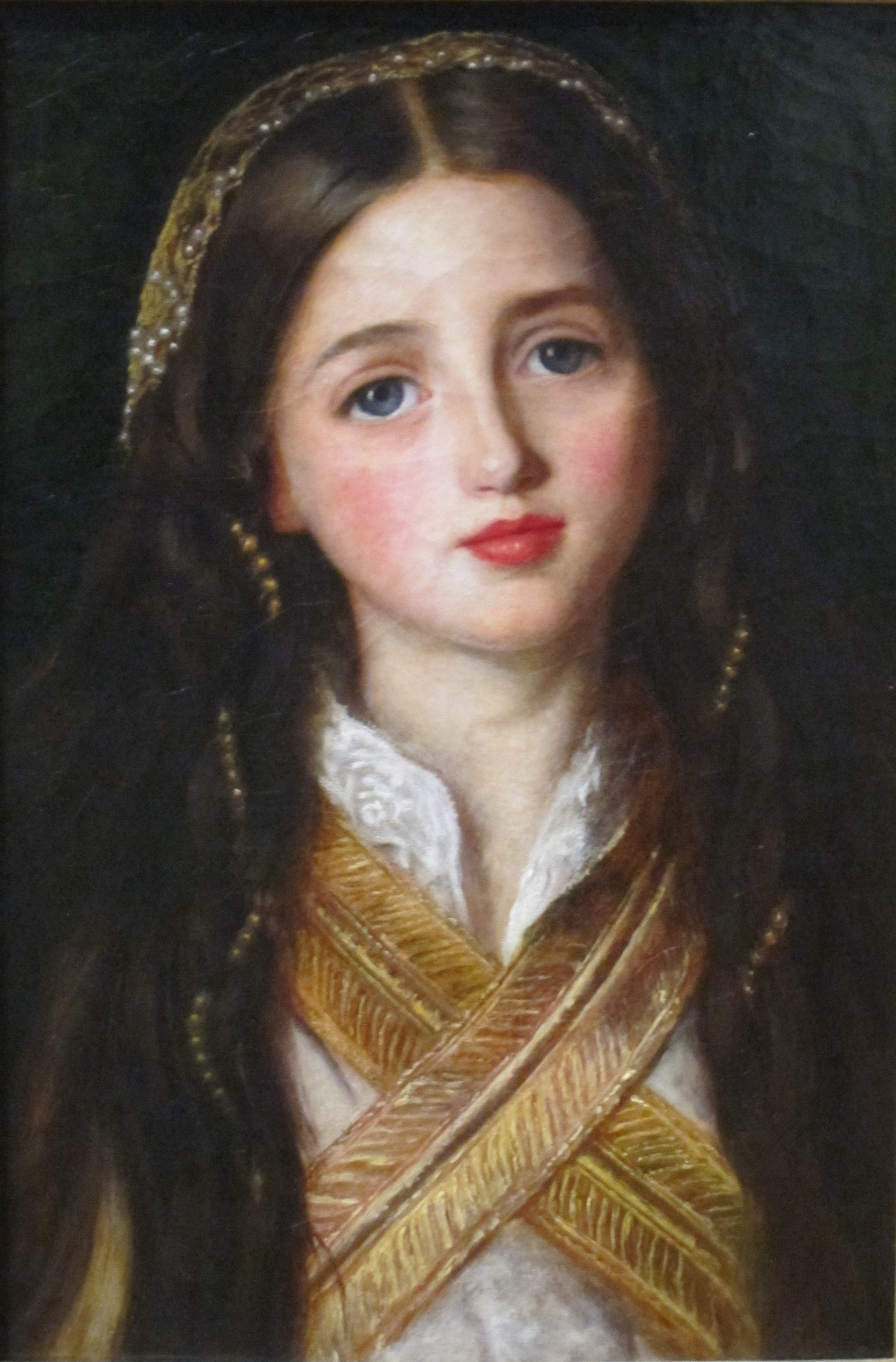
- Artist: John Everett Millais
- Year: 1857
- Type: Oil on canvas
- Dimensions: 30.5 cm × 20.3 cm (12.0 in × 8.0 in)
- Location: Private collection

Alice Gray is an 1857 oil painting by the English artist John Everett Millais, depicting Millais' young sister-in-law, Alice Gray (1845–1929), a sister of his wife Effie Gray. The painting is also known under an alternative title, Head of a Girl. The portrait shows a girl gazing forward with head tilted, wearing a white blouse or dress with a golden crossed band over it, and a golden headdress decorated with pearls. Pearls are braided down into her hair, which hangs loose at her shoulders.

== The painting ==
Alice Gray was painted in the summer and autumn of 1857, when Millais and Effie were living with Effie's parents and sisters at Bowerswell, the Gray family home in Perth. It is a pendant (companion piece) to a similarly-sized portrait of another of Effie and Alice Gray's sisters, Sophie (1843–1882), which Millais produced at the same time.

The painting hung under the title Head of a Girl (catalogue number 31) in a special Winter Exhibition at the Royal Academy, London, held between January and March 1898, which featured many collected works of the late Millais. Confusingly, the portrait of Sophie also hung in 1898 under this title (catalogue number 28), and there has historically been some confusion between the portraits and their sitters. It has been noted that "there is a distinct difference between the two portraits. The painting of Alice, the youngest sister, is a straightforward portrait of an immature girl. The portrait of Sophie, on the other hand, is alive with an electric energy between the sitter and the artist."

The portraits were bought by Millais' friend George Price Boyce and his sister Joanna - both siblings were artists. Boyce paid 60 guineas to Millais for the Sophie portrait on 25 November 1857, only a few months after its creation. Joanna bought its pendant, Alice Gray, on 23 February 1858 from Millais, also for 60 guineas.

At the time of the 1898 exhibition at the Royal Academy, Alice Gray was the property of H. T. Wells Esq., R.A., the widower of Joanna Boyce. It then passed down to their daughter, Mrs Arthur Street, while Sophie Gray was bought at the auction of George Price Boyce's paintings by his daughter, Mrs Ernest Charrington (later Mrs Wilfrid Hadley). The two cousins lent both paintings to an exhibition at the Tate Gallery in 1923, the last occasion on which either picture was recorded until they independently reappeared on the market in the early 2000s.

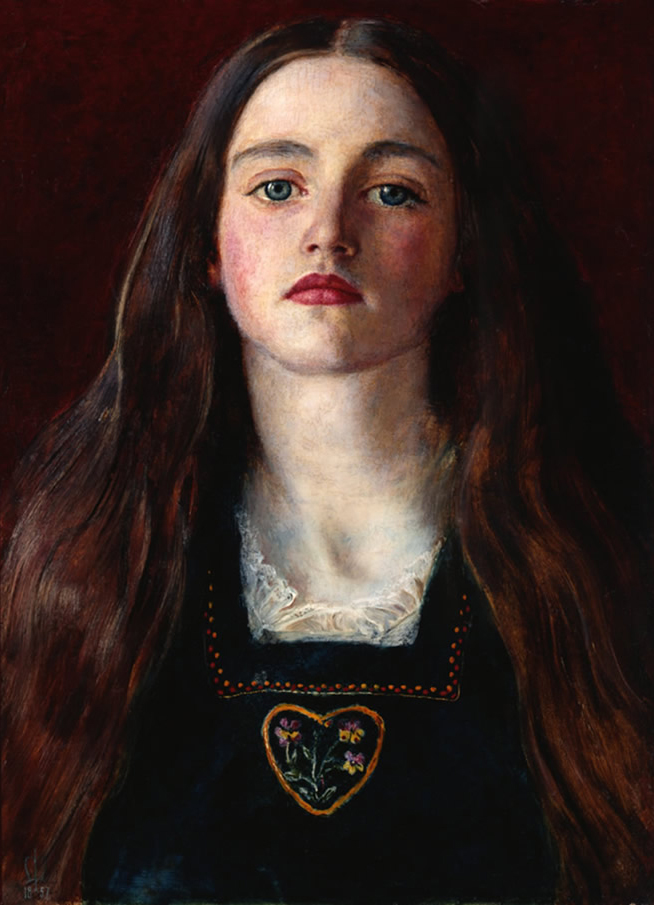
Sophie Gray, the 1857 pendant portrait to Alice Gray by Millais.

Alice Gray was sold at auction by Christie's in its "Important British Art" (Lot 11) sale on 14 June 2000, for £157,750, to an anonymous buyer.

== See also ==
- List of paintings by John Everett Millais
