= Sophie Gray (1857 Millais portrait) =

Painting by John Everett Millais

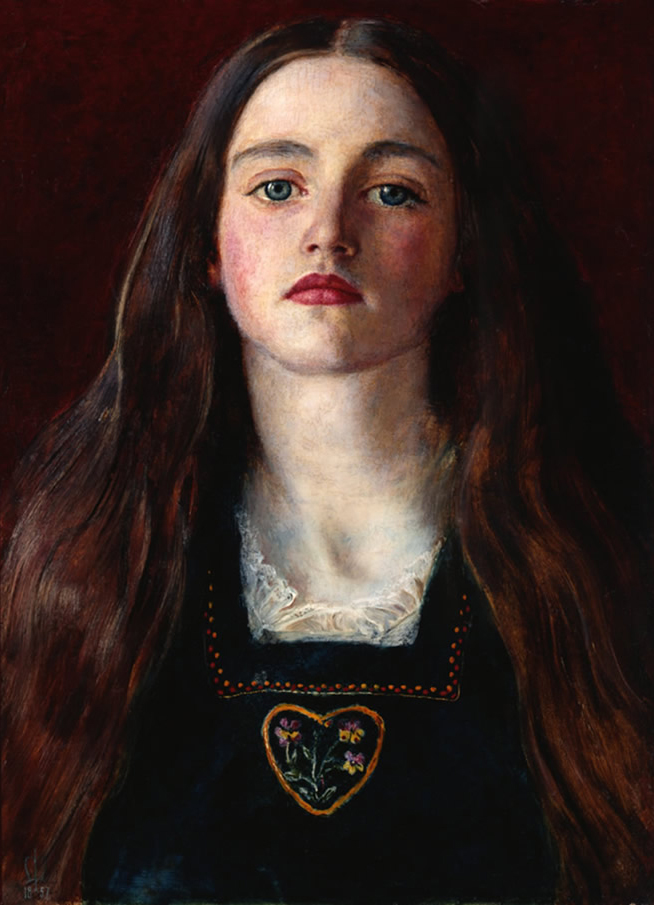
- Artist: John Everett Millais
- Year: 1857
- Type: Oil on paper laid over panel
- Dimensions: 30 cm × 23 cm (12 in × 9.1 in)
- Location: Private collection

Sophie Gray is an 1857 oil painting by the English artist John Everett Millais, depicting Millais' sister-in-law, Sophie Gray (28 October 1843–15 March 1882), the sister of his wife Effie Gray, when she was thirteen or just turned fourteen. The painting is also known under various other titles: Head of a Girl, Portrait of a Girl and Portrait of a Young Lady. The portrait shows a girl looking directly at the viewer, with chin slightly raised upwards, exposing her throat. She wears a green dress with a heart-shaped embroidery of wild pansies (also known by the common name Heartsease) in the centre. Her hair hangs loose to her shoulders.

== The painting ==
Sophie Gray was painted in the summer and autumn of 1857, when Millais and Effie were living with Effie's parents and sisters at Bowerswell, the Gray family home in Perth. It is a pendant (companion piece) to a similarly-sized portrait of Effie and Sophie Gray's other sister, Alice (1845–1929), which Millais produced at the same time.

The painting hung under the title Head of a Girl (catalogue number 28) in a special Winter Exhibition at the Royal Academy, London, held between January and March 1898, which featured many collected works of the late Millais. At the time it was the property of Mrs Wilfred Hadley. Confusingly, the portrait of Alice also hung in 1898 under this title (catalogue number 31), and there has historically been some confusion between the portraits and their sitters. It has been noted that "there is a distinct difference between the two portraits. The painting of Alice, the youngest sister, is a straightforward portrait of an immature girl. The portrait of Sophie, on the other hand, is alive with an electric energy between the sitter and the artist."

Sophie Gray is a sensual, knowing, and direct image, which, almost inevitably, has provoked questions about the nature of Millais' relationship with his sister-in-law. There was undoubtedly a strong affection between them, which may well have grown into mutual infatuation. According to Mary Lutyens, who researched the lives of Effie, Ruskin and Millais, (Note: Daughter of the architect Sir Edwin Lutyens, Mary Lutyens edited three books of Effie Gray's letters between 1965 and 1972.) it was rumoured that Effie had to send Gray away because of concerns that she and Millais were growing too close; however, there is no clear evidence of a more intimate relationship between them. Gray's parents were content for Millais to chaperone her – for example, on an overnight train to London – and, whatever the truth of any rumour, Effie remained close to her sister and often invited her to stay after she and Millais moved back to London in 1861. When Gray later became ill, Effie visited her frequently.

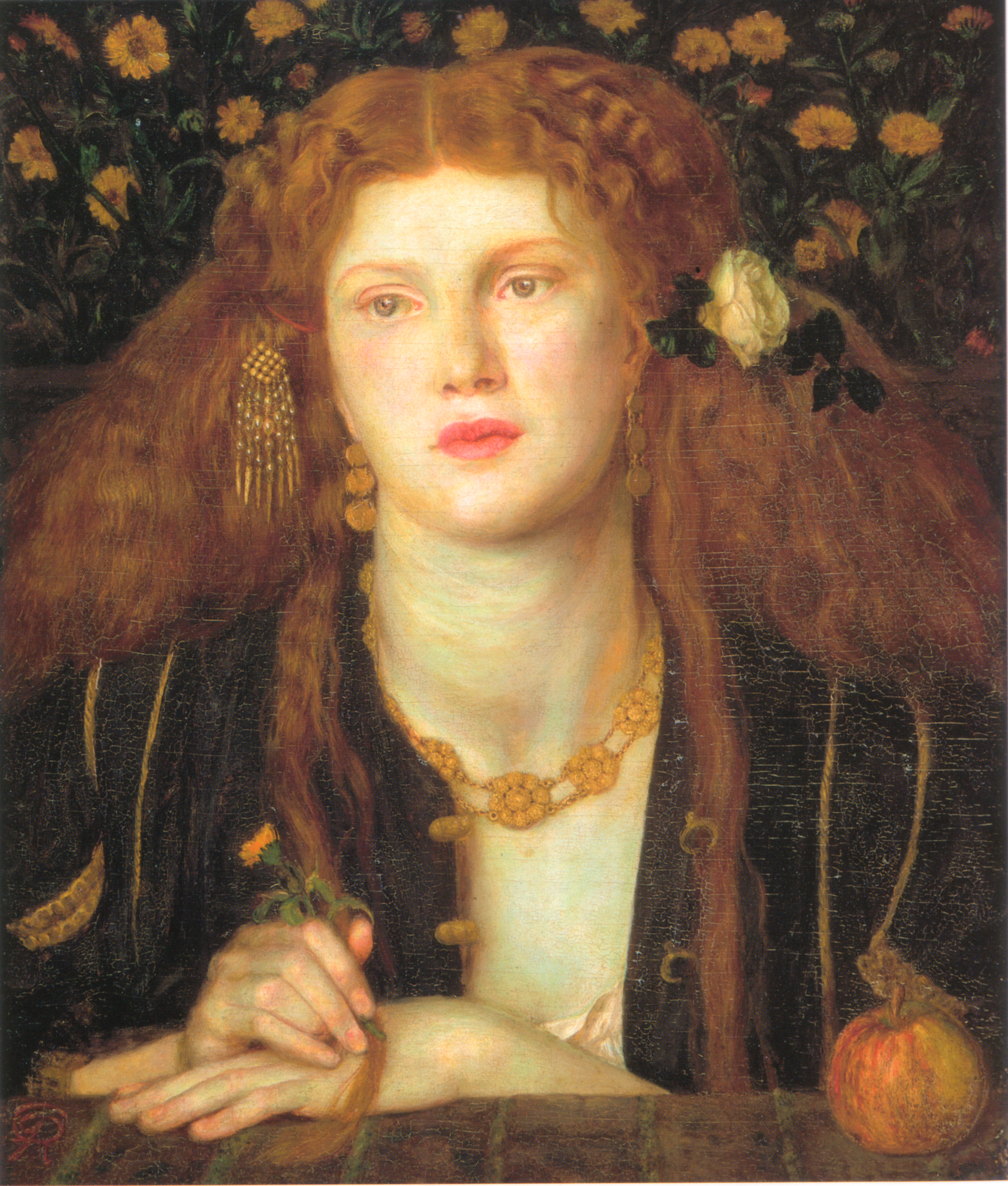
Bocca Baciata by Dante Gabriel Rossetti (1859), commissioned by George Price Boyce to hang next to Sophie Gray.

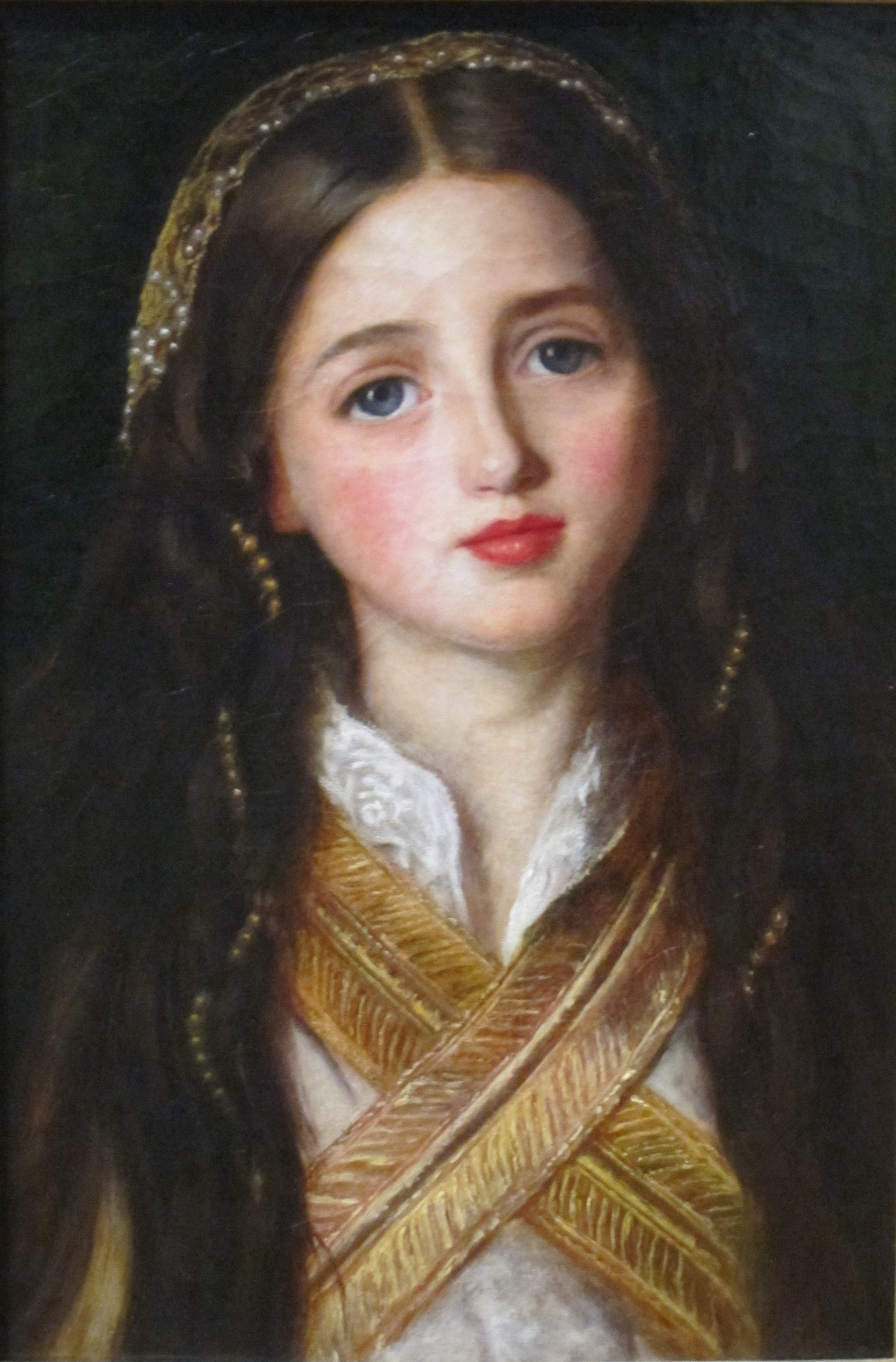
Alice Gray, the 1857 pendant portrait to Sophie Gray by Millais.

The portraits were bought by Millais' friend George Price Boyce and his sister Joanna - both siblings were artists. Boyce paid 60 guineas to Millais for the Sophie portrait on 25 November 1857, only a few months after its creation. Joanna bought its pendant, Alice Gray, on 23 February 1858 from Millais, also for 60 guineas.

In 1859, Boyce commissioned Dante Gabriel Rossetti’s landmark "stunner" painting Bocca Baciata ("the mouth that has been kissed") (Museum of Fine Arts, Boston), which he planned to hang next to the portrait of Sophie.

In a sale of Boyce's picture collection at Christie’s in London on 2 July 1897, the Sophie portrait (catalogue number 208) was sold to Boyce's daughter, Mrs Ernest Charrington (later Mrs Wilfrid Hadley), for 70 guineas. Alice Gray passed down to Joanna's daughter, Mrs Arthur Street. The two cousins lent both paintings to an exhibition at the Tate Gallery in 1923, the last occasion on which either picture was recorded until they independently reappeared on the market in the early 2000s. Sophie Gray passed down through Mrs Ernest Charrington/Mrs Wilfrid Hadley's family until it was sold in 2000 by Anthony Ostrowski to Peter Nahum at the Leicester Galleries in London for £450,000. It was then sold to Javier Baz in 2001 and then on to a private collector.

A major exhibition featuring Sophie Gray, Pre-Raphaelites: Victorian Avant-Garde, travelled between several different venues: Tate Gallery, London (12 September 2012–13 January 2013); National Gallery of Art, Washington, D.C.(17 February 2013–19 May 2013); and the Pushkin Museum, Moscow (10 June 2013–30 September 2013). In London Sophie Gray hung next to Millais' Autumn Leaves (1855–56), which also features Sophie Gray as a model; in Washington D.C. it hung next to Rossetti’s Bocca Baciata.

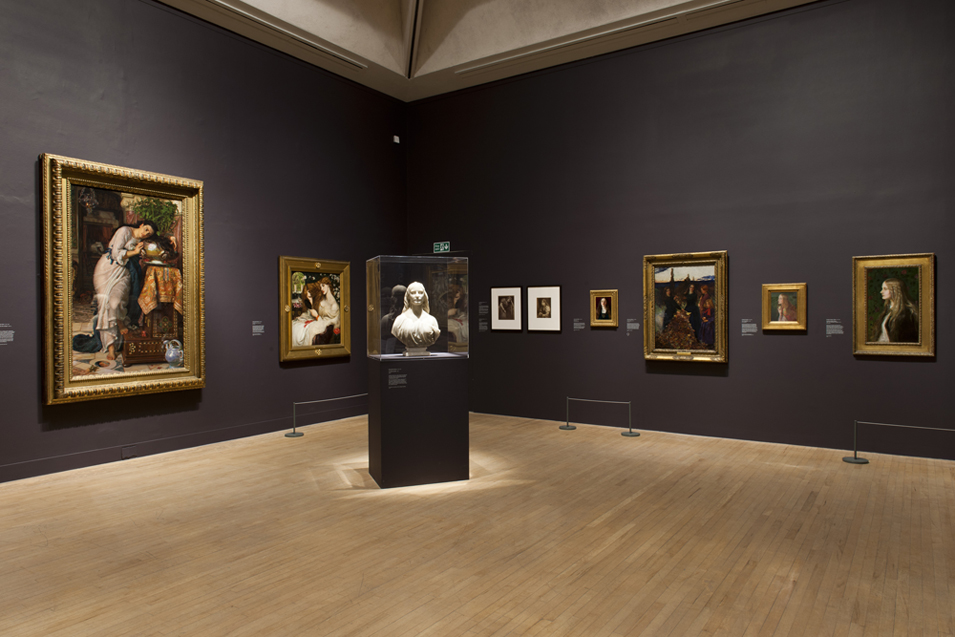
Pre-Raphaelites: Victorian Avant-Garde, Tate Britain, 12 September 2012–13 January 2013, installation view of gallery 5, "Beauty". Sophie Gray is to the left of Autumn Leaves on the back right wall.

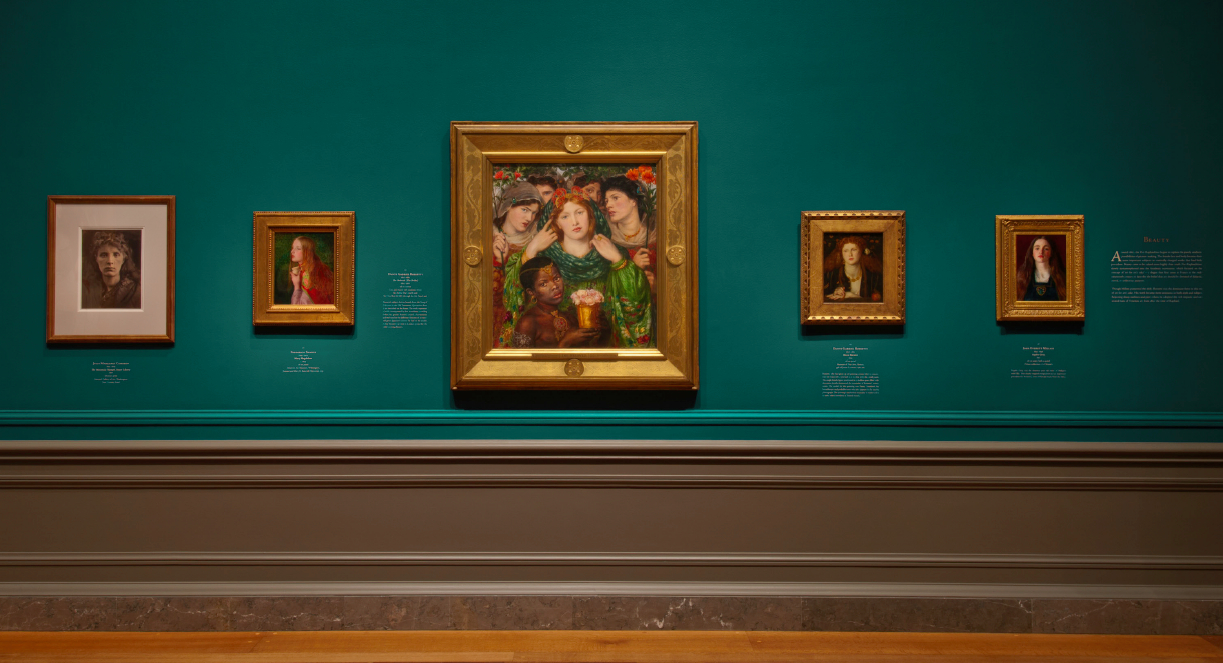
Pre-Raphaelites: Victorian-Avant Garde, National Gallery of Art, Washington, D.C., 17 February 2013–19 May 2013, installation view of gallery 6, "Beauty". Sophie Gray is at the right-hand side of the image, to the right of Bocca Baciata.

== See also ==
- List of paintings by John Everett Millais
