= James Riordan (actor) =

American actor

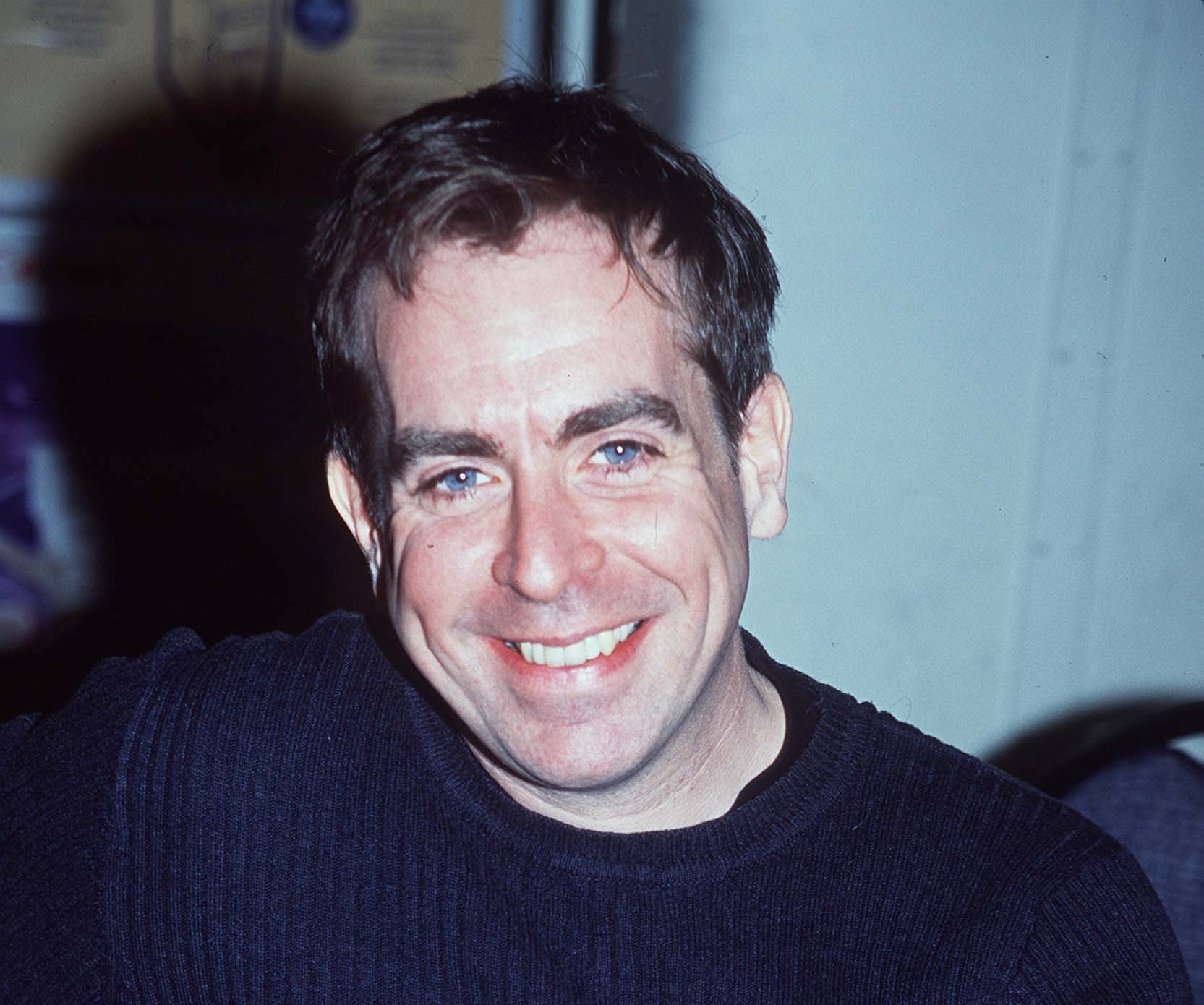
Actor James Riordan

James Riordan (born February 15, 1969, in Cleveland, Ohio) is a New York City-based Broadway, film and television actor.

== Theatre work ==
=== Broadway ===
On Broadway James Riordan played Frank Whitworth in Jerusalem with Mark Rylance, and in The Elephant Man with Billy Crudup, Kate Burton and Rupert Graves. The New York Daily News review of The Elephant Man called his performance "wonderful" in a "variety of roles" and Curtain UP said, "The supporting cast is also well chosen, with especially good work from Jack Gilpin, and James Riordan". James Riordan's other Broadway credits are "Present Laughter" with Kevin KlineDance of Death starring Helen Mirren and Ian McKellen and the comedy Noises Off by Michael Frayn,

=== The Countess ===
Off-Broadway James Riordan portrayed Victorian art critic John Ruskin in The Countess by Gregory Murphy at both the Samuel Beckett and later the Lamb's Theatre Theater. The New York Times called the performance "excellent," and Time Out noted "Riordan and Woodward have a thrilling, tightly wound confidence on stage. These are two heavyweight performances."

=== Lovers ===
Also Off-Broadway, Riordan appeared in the revival of Brian Friel's Lovers; a pair of related one-act plays "Winners" and "Losers". The New York Times called the production "expertly acted," and The Associated Press noted "Riordan is intense and funny as Andy. Brazda and Riordan share a couple of perfectly timed farcical scenes, hastily trying to make love while he frenetically shouts poetry so her mother won't ring that bell"

=== Other work ===
Other Off-Broadway work included a revival of the rarely performed Donogoo by Jules Romains at the Mint Theater company, and the New York premiere of Neal Bell's surrealist play Ready for the River at the Home For Contemporary Theater and Art.

During the summer of 2022, James Riordan appeared with Timothy Busfield in the world premiere of a play co-authored by Tom Hanks "Safe Home," based on a series of short stories by Hanks. The play was performed at the Shadowlands Theater Company in Upstate NY.

== Television ==
On television, he appeared as Franklin Werner in the HBO series Boardwalk Empire, in a recurring role on the final season of the television series Damages, and in recurring roles on the daytime soap operas As the World Turns and All My Children. He has appeared multiple times on Law & Order, Law & Order: Special Victims Unit and Law & Order: Criminal Intent. James Riordan also played "James Brett" in the 2012 ABC Studios television pilot Dark Horse directed by Roland Emmerich. In 2014, he appeared as "Ian Wright" on the CBS television series The Blacklist.

Riordan's film credits include The Hoax directed by My Life as a Dog director Lasse Hallstrom and Choose.

== Filmography ==
=== Film ===
Year	Title	Role	Director	Notes
2012	Dark Horse	James Brett	Roland Emmerich	TV film
2017	The Post	Vice Admiral Joseph Francis Blouin	Steven Spielberg	

=== Television ===
Year	Title	Role	Notes
1990	One Life to Live	Wayman Link	Episode #1.5742
1991	Loving	ADA Mark Winter	Episode #1.2173
2000	Wonderland	Francis Polk	Episode: "20/20 Hindsight"
2006	Law & Order: Criminal Intent	Reuben	Episode: "6,741"
2004–2007	Law & Order	Miles Foster, Jeremy Pollack, Roger Mallory	2 episodes
2009	All My Children	Judge Edward Pearson	8 episodes
2009	Gossip Girl	Coop	Episode: "Southern Gentlemen Prefer Blondes"
2007–2010	As the World Turns	Dr. Greg Hearn/Dr. Daniel Hearn	15 episodes
2012	Damages	British Interviewer	3 episodes
2013	White Collar	Everett	Episode: "The Original"
2013	Boardwalk Empire	Franklin Werner	Episode: "New York Sour"
2013	Law & Order: Special Victims Unit	Brett Landau	Episode: "October Surprise"
2014	The Blacklist	Ian Wright	Episode: "Milton Bobbit (No. 135)"
2015	Public Morals	Dandy Lanier	Episode: "Starts with a Snowflake"
2016	Person of Interest	Dr. Aaron Wendell	Episode: "6,741"
2016	Limitless	Dr. Howard Gilroy	Episode: "Stop Me Before I Hug Again"
2018	Bull	Judge Wentworth	Episode: "Separation"
2019	Blue Bloods	Chris Johnson	Episode: "Two-Faced"
2021	Halston	Henry Bissett	Episode: "Becoming Halston"
2022	The Gilded Age	Dr. Ambrose Lewis	recurring Season 2
