= Sophie Gray =

Artist's model and sister-in-law to painter John Everett Millais (1843–1882)

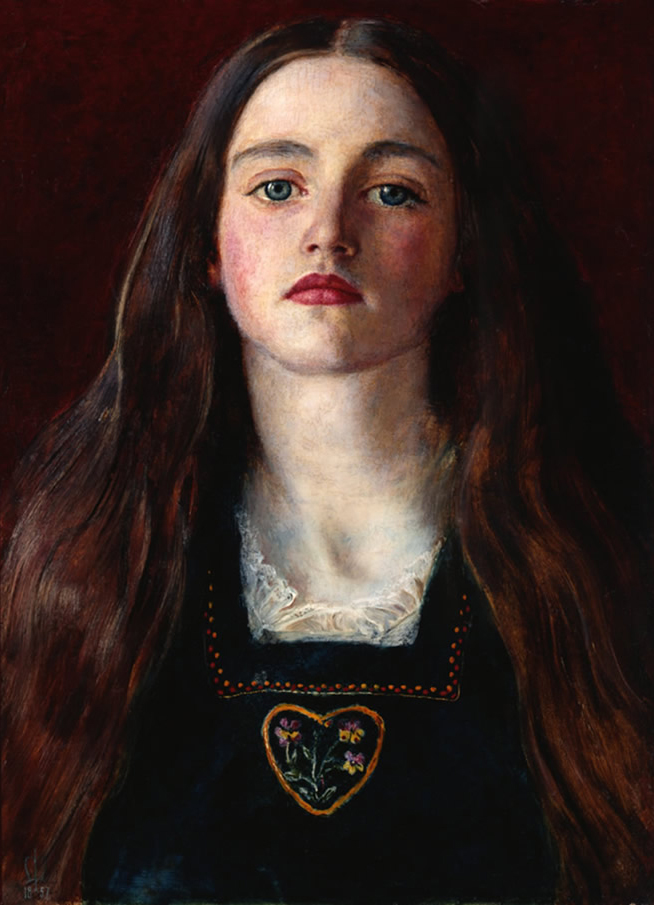
- Sophie Gray, Millais' 1857 painting of Sophie Gray
- Born: Sophia Margaret Gray; 28 October 1843
- Died: 15 March 1882 (aged 38)
- Known for: Model for the pre-Raphaelite painter John Everett Millais
- Spouse: James Caird (m. 1873)
- Children: Beatrix Ada Caird
- Relatives: Effie Gray (sister); John Everett Millais (brother-in-law)

Sophia Margaret "Sophie" Gray (28 October 1843 – 15 March 1882), later Sophia Margaret Caird, was a Scottish model for her brother-in-law, the Pre-Raphaelite painter John Everett Millais. She was a younger sister of Euphemia "Effie" Gray, who married Millais in 1855 after the annulment of her marriage to John Ruskin. The spelling of her name was, after around 1861, sometimes "Sophy," but only within the family. In public she was known as Sophie and later in life, after her marriage, as Sophia.

From the late 1860s, she suffered from a mental illness which seems to have involved a form of anorexia nervosa. In 1873, she married the Scottish entrepreneur James Caird and together they had a daughter. She died in 1882, probably as a result of her anorexia.

== Background ==
Sophie Gray was born in October 1843 to Sophia Margaret Gray, née Jameson (1808–1894), and George Gray (1798–1877), a Scottish lawyer and businessman. Her maternal grandfather, Andrew Jameson, became Sheriff-substitute of Fife. Effie Gray (1828–1897), known initially to the family as "Phemy," was the first of fifteen children, and Sophie was the tenth—three sisters, one also named Sophia Margaret, predeceased her. Two of her five elder brothers died before her birth and two passed away before she was seven.

The family lived at Bowerswell, a house re-built in 1842 near the foot of Kinnoull Hill, south-east of Perth. As a child, Gray frequently visited and stayed in London with her sister Effie and her husband, the critic and artist John Ruskin. To an extent Effie, who was fifteen years older than Sophie, acted as a kind of second mother to her and Effie's other siblings. From a young age, Gray was exposed to the increasingly strained circumstances of the Ruskins' unconsummated marriage. In fact, through her increasing presence in the Ruskin household, Gray may, in some respects, have been a convenient chaperone for her elder sister, whose largely independent social life tended to attract comment. (Note: Brownell makes this point rather more forcefully, suggesting that Sophie's parents had deliberately placed her as a chaperone in her sister's household because they were concerned about Effie's flirtatious behaviour. Sophie was nine years old in 1853.) According to Effie, Ruskin's manservant, Frederick Crawley, expressed to Gray his concern that other servants might spread gossip "all over Camberwell."

Gray's governess of three years, a French woman named Delphine, appears to have been discharged by the Grays in March 1854 because of Gray's habit of confiding in her.

== Effie Gray's flight from Ruskin and marriage to Millais ==
On 25 April 1854 Effie left her husband on the pretence of visiting her parents in Scotland. Gray had been staying with the Ruskins, at their home in Herne Hill since just after Christmas 1853 and appears to have been complicit in her sister's flight. She and Effie were seen off in silence by Ruskin at the recently opened King's Cross station, where, accompanied by Crawley, they boarded a train for Edinburgh. However, Gray alighted at Hitchin, Hertfordshire where her parents were waiting. Her mother took her place on the train, while she and her father returned to London to deliver a package from Effie to her solicitors. That evening a citation of nullity was delivered to Ruskin, together with certain effects such as Effie's wedding ring and her keys. (Note: Crawley, who probably had a prior inkling of what was afoot, remained on the train with Effie and her mother.) The following day Gray and her father returned to Scotland by steamer.

Effie was granted a decree of nullity on 20 July 1854. The previous summer, she, Ruskin, and his protégé John Millais had spent four months together in the Scottish Highlands, during which time she and Millais formed a close and increasingly intimate bond. (Note: A revisionist and romanticized view of Effie's relationship with the wealthy Ruskin is that Effie, never short of male admirers, married him because her family was in financial difficulty and that, subsequently, Ruskin encouraged her relationship with Millais as a means of ending the marriage, threatening divorce if proceedings for annulment were not begun. It was even rumoured that the wedding between Ruskin and Effie has been brought forward to forestall bailiffs.) In early 1854, Millais painted a portrait of Gray for her parents. Through her regular visits to his studio in Gower Street, London, where she impressed Millais with her patience, Gray was able to act as go-between with Effie. During this period, Ruskin's mother (to whom her son was close) appears to have indulged Gray, while, at the same time, casting aspersions on Effie, who was under considerable stress. For his part, Ruskin sometimes accompanied Gray on walks, in the course of which he too spoke slightingly of his wife, possibly seeking to turn Gray against her. Effie's surviving letters to her parents suggest that Gray kept her well informed of such adverse criticism.

After the annulment of her marriage, Effie avoided Millais for some time, although he remained in contact with the girls' mother. Effie and Gray, whose governess was not replaced, spent much of the summer at St Andrews, on the coast of Fife, with their younger sister, Alice Elizabeth Gray (1845–1929). (Note: Alice married George Davey Stibbard (1833-1899), the family's solicitor, on 26 January 1874) They went for walks together and Effie, who had been well educated herself, acted as her sisters’ teacher. The following year, Millais came up to Bowerswell, where they were married in June 1855.

== Gray as model ==
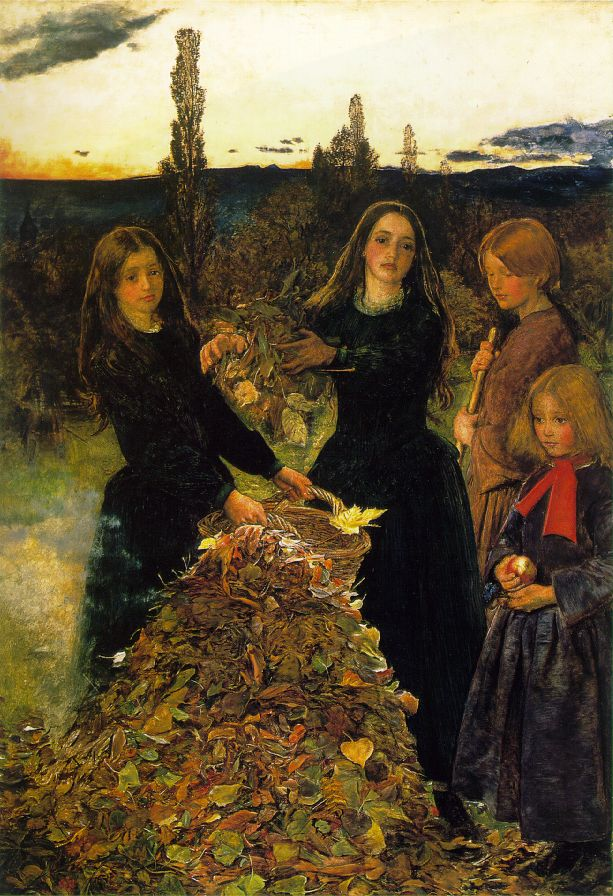
Gray, at right centre, in Autumn Leaves. Alice Gray is on the left.

For the next few years, Gray continued to sit for Millais. After he and Effie moved to Annat Lodge, close to Bowerswell, she was readily available for this purpose, but while it seems she was beginning to displace Effie herself as a favoured subject, it is unsurprising that Effie wanted to keep herself out of the public eye to a degree, following the very public dissolution of her marriage. (Note: Effie had first sat for her future husband's The Order of Release, 1746 in March 1853 and previously for other artists. Nonetheless, Effie would sit for two major works by Millais, Peace Concluded (1856) and The Eve of St. Agnes (1862-3).) In the words of art historian Suzanne Fagence Cooper, whose biographical chapter about Gray (2010) provides the fullest account of her life, Gray "changes before our eyes from a child to a stunning teenager." This change can be traced in three works by Millais: Autumn Leaves (1855–56), Spring (or Apple Blossoms) (1856–59 - the figures were finished in 1858) and, most strikingly, in a small, but "unnerving" portrait of her at the age of 13, with several titles including Portrait of a Young Lady, or simply Sophie Gray (1857). (Note: 30 x 23 centimetres: see Barringer, Rosenfeld & Smith (Tate, 2012) Pre-Raphaelites: Victorian Avant-Garde, p. 160) Charles Edward Perugini also painted a portrait of Gray as a young woman; the date is not known with certainty and for some years it was attributed mistakenly to Millais.

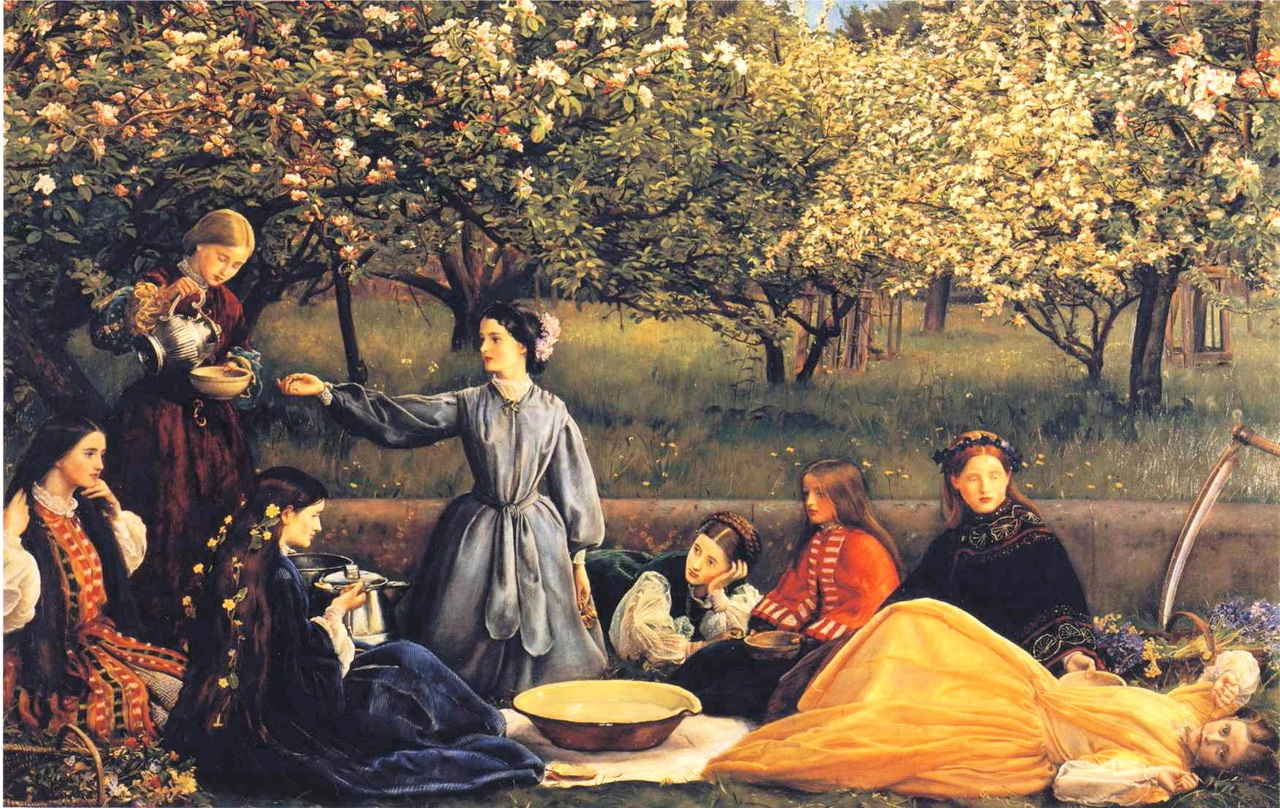
Millais' Spring, also known as Apple Blossoms, with Gray on the far left.

=== Autumn Leaves and Spring ===
In Autumn Leaves, Gray is one of four girls beside a smoking bonfire of leaves. Her sister Alice is also in this picture, together with two local girls at the right procured by Effie. (Note: Autumn Leaves is now in the Manchester Art Gallery and is still used frequently to illustrate autumnal themes and/or bonfires: see, for example, Country Life, 23 November 2011.) Of the four, only Gray appears to be verging on womanhood.

In the later Spring, eight girls (whose ages ranged from 12 to 15) recline in an orchard. Gray is depicted at the left of the painting in profile, wearing a colourful, striped robe, with long flowing hair. Alice appears twice (and possibly three times) - she lies on the right, somewhat provocatively with a blade of grass in her mouth; she is also the girl fourth from the right, lying with her elbow on the ground and resting her head on her hand. She may also be the seated figure in blue, third from the left.

=== Sophie Gray and Gray’s relationship with Millais ===
Sophie Gray is a sensual, knowing, and direct image, which, almost inevitably, has provoked questions about the nature of Millais' relationship with his sister-in-law. There was undoubtedly a strong affection between them, which may well have grown into mutual infatuation. According to Mary Lutyens, who researched the lives of Effie, Ruskin and Millais, (Note: Daughter of the architect Sir Edwin Lutyens, Mary Lutyens edited three books of Effie Gray's letters between 1965 and 1972.) it was rumoured that Effie had to send Gray away because of concerns that she and Millais were growing too close; however, there is no clear evidence of a more intimate relationship between them. Gray's parents were content for Millais to chaperone her – for example, on an overnight train to London – and, whatever the truth of any rumour, Effie remained close to her sister and often invited her to stay after she and Millais moved back to London in 1861. When Gray later became ill, Effie visited her frequently.

Unlike Millais' 1854 portrait of Gray, his later work was not kept by the family. It was sold to George Price Boyce, a friend of Millais' Pre-Raphaelite brother, Dante Gabriel Rossetti, who painted a portrait of Fanny Cornforth, a lover he shared with Boyce, to hang alongside that of Gray. Entitled Bocca Baciata ("the mouth that has been kissed") after a theme in Boccacio's Decameron, Rossetti's picture (1859) was described by William Holman Hunt, another member of the Pre-Raphaelite Brotherhood, as "remarkable for gross sensuality of a revolting kind ... I see Rossetti as advocating as a principle the mere gratification of the eye." As Cooper has remarked, this "after-life" of Sophie Gray demonstrated its "erotic potential." The two pictures, by Millais and Rossetti, hung side-by-side in the exhibition "Pre-Raphaelites: Victorian Avant-Garde" when the exhibition was on view at the National Gallery of Art in Washington, D.C., demonstrating two strands of Pre-Raphaelite conceptions of female beauty in, respectively, the forms of realism and Aestheticism.

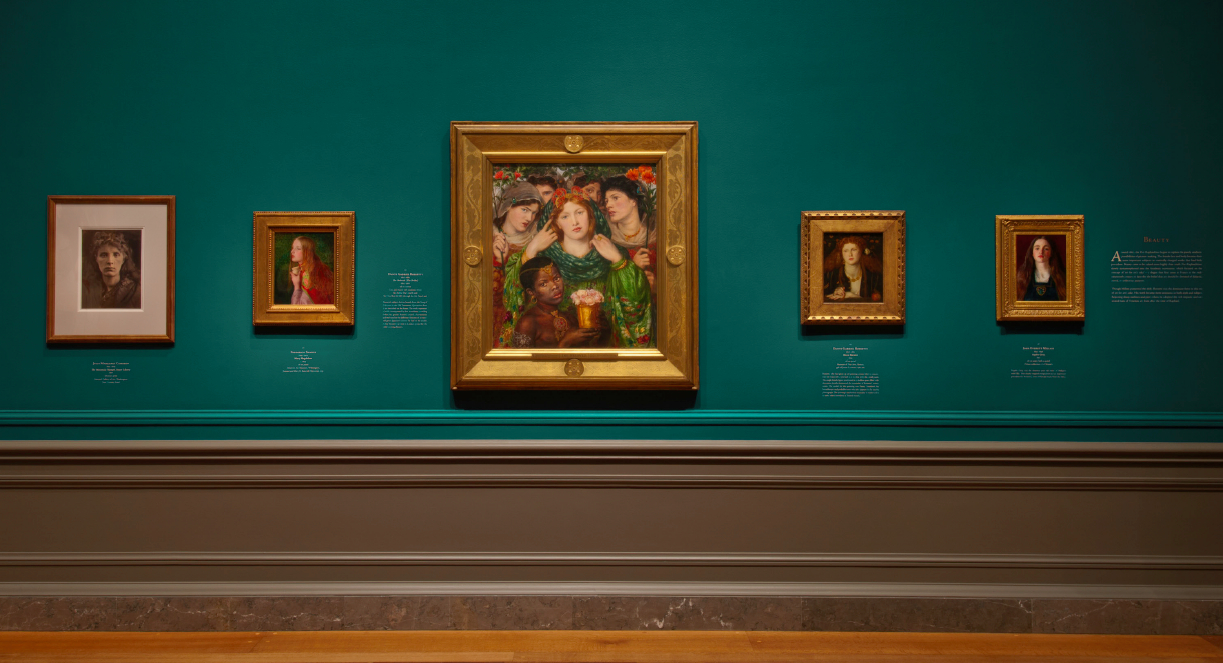
Pre-Raphaelites: Victorian-Avant Garde, National Gallery of Art, Washington, D.C., 17 February - 19 May 2013, installation view of gallery 6, "Beauty"

In 2012 Autumn Leaves and Sophie Gray, the latter from a private collection, were displayed alongside each other in Tate Britain's major exhibition of Pre-Raphaelites, Victorian Avant-Garde.

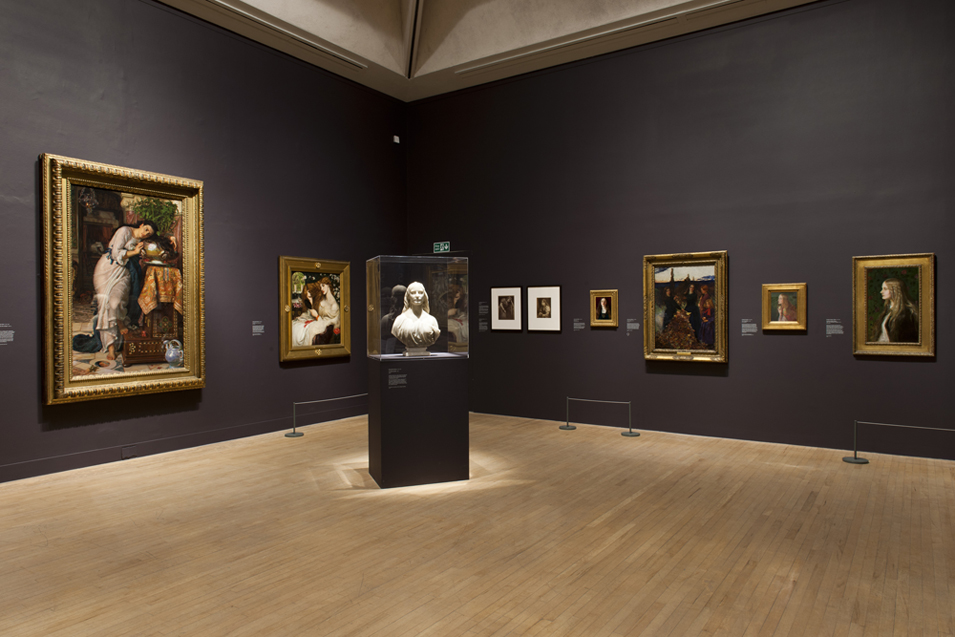
Pre-Raphaelites: Victorian Avant-Garde, Tate Britain, 12 September 2012 - 13 January 2013, installation view of gallery 5, "Beauty"

== Mental illness and marriage ==
In 1868 Gray became unwell. It is clear from letters at the time that she was suffering from anorexia nervosa. She also became restless and obsessed with music, especially piano playing. Her speech was often incoherent. In March 1869 Millais wrote to William Holman Hunt that Gray had "been ill a whole year, and away from home, with hysteria."

At the request of the Grays, Millais placed Gray at Chiswick Asylum, Chiswick under the care of Dr Thomas Harrington Tuke (1826–88), a leading practitioner in mental illness. Tuke had treated Millais' friend, the painter Edwin Landseer, and, a year or so after Gray came to him, was involved in the case of Harriet Mordaunt, respondent in a scandalous divorce action. Gray lived with the family of one of Tuke's colleagues until she was well enough to move to lodgings in Hammersmith in 1869 and then back to Bowerswell in Perth. Although the state of her health fluctuated, it was to remain a problem for her and a concern to others for the rest of her life.

=== Marriage to James Caird ===
On 16 July 1873 Gray married James Key Caird (1837–1916), a Dundee jute manufacturer who had courted her for several years. Caird was disliked by her family, who thought him two-faced and who were still mindful of Effie's disastrous marriage to Ruskin. They would have been aware also that the port of Dundee had, for some time, been taking trade away from Perth. However, attempts to dissuade Gray from going ahead with the wedding were muted by fears of triggering a further collapse of her health.

The Cairds' only child, Beatrix Ada, was born in 1874. The father was notably absent during Gray's confinement, thereby intensifying bad feeling with her family. In 1875, he forbade Gray from staying with Effie on her way to France and, more generally, at a time when his business was expanding, he seems to have been both inconsiderate and uncaring towards her.

== Final years ==
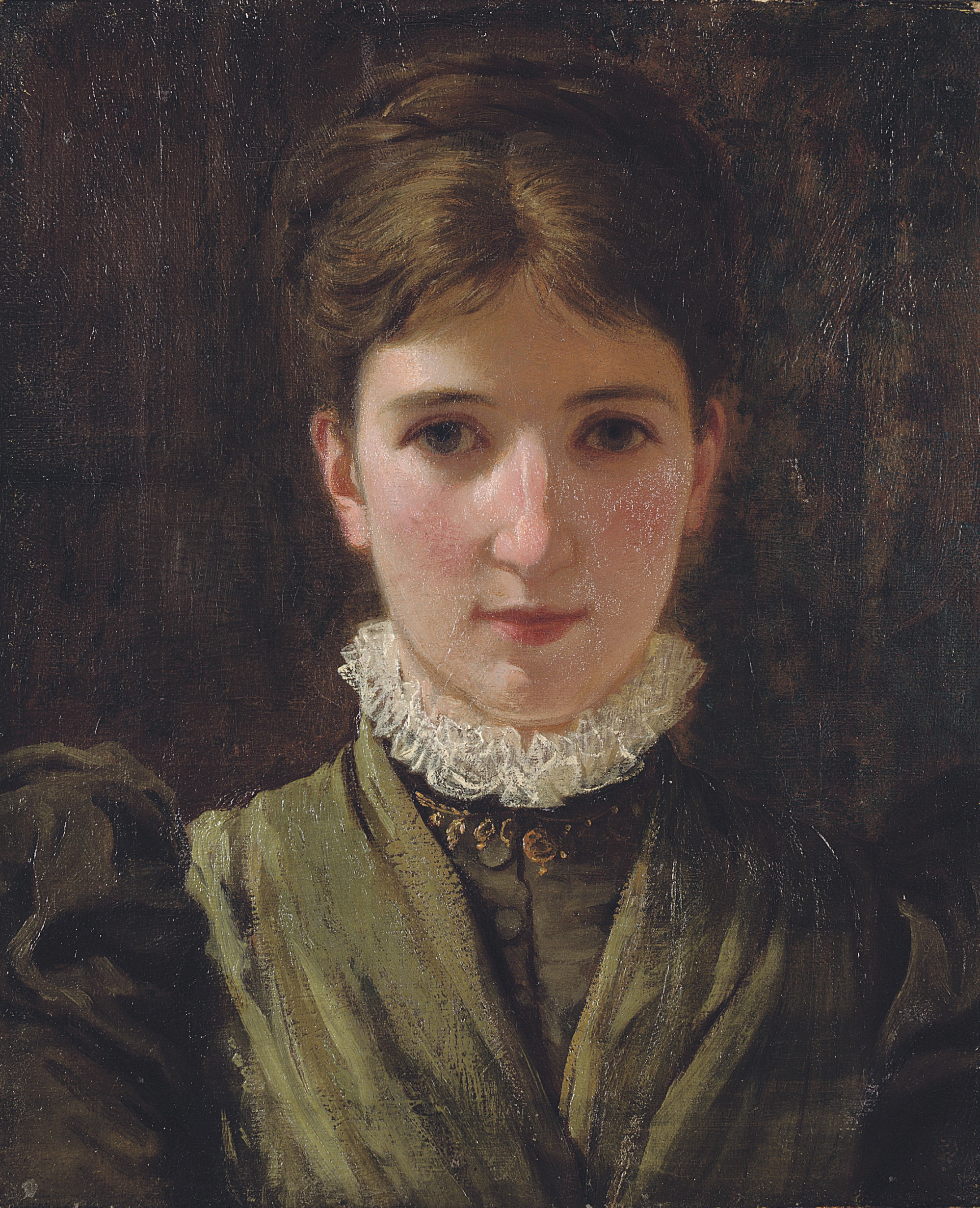
Charles Edward Perugini; Portrait of Sophia Gray; oil on canvas, 26.6 x 22.2 cm, previously attributed J E Millais.

Millais' 1880 portrait of Gray, oil on canvas, 50 x 32 in., Geoffroy Richard Everett Millais Collection

During her final years, Gray spent much of her time alone with Beatrix, mostly living between Dundee and Paris. In 1880 Millais painted a final portrait of her, which was exhibited at the new Grosvenor Gallery. Mary Lutyens wrote of it that Millais "perhaps more than anyone, knew the secrets of Sophie's short life, and in her hauntingly sad expression portrayed an old sadness of his own." The portrait hung in Effie and John Everett Millais' house at Palace Gate, London, and remains in the family.

By the 1880s Gray had become increasingly emaciated (the effects largely hidden from others by the weight of late Victorian clothing), and in 1882 returned to the care of Tuke. She died on 15 March 1882, aged 38. Tuke gave the cause of death as exhaustion and "atrophy of nervous system, 17 years." Rumours that Gray died of suicide have never been substantiated.

Millais painted a portrait of Gray's daughter, Beatrix Caird, in 1879, but she died in 1888 at age 13. James Caird subsequently used his wealth to support Ernest Shackleton's Trans-Antarctic expedition of 1914–1917, and was a significant benefactor to the city of Dundee. He became a baronet in 1913. (Note: As a result, both Effie and Sophie Gray married men who received baronetcies, Millais having been granted his in 1885 (in Effie's lifetime).)

== Popular culture ==
In Emma Thompson's film Effie Gray, completed in 2013, Sophie is portrayed by Polly Dartford. Effie Gray is played by Dakota Fanning.
