= Kim Morrissey =

Canadian writer

Janice Dales aka Kim Morrissey is a Canadian poet and playwright who lives in London, England. Many of her works examine the role of women in nineteenth century culture, re-imagining the lives of historical figures. She is also part of the Comedy Collective UK (which included Colin Shelbourn, John Random, Ivan Shakespeare, Lee Barnett, Claire Storey, Jasmine Birtles, Robert Priest). The working drafts of Morrissey's play Mrs Ruskin, about Effie Gray, have been published on the web. She has written for various radio dramas and documentaries, as well as the 1980s political satire radio show Week Ending.

Morissey's Poems for Men who Dream of Lolita purport to be written by Lolita herself, reflecting on the events in the story, a sort of diary in poetry form. Morrissey portrays Lolita as an innocent, wounded soul. In speaking of her work in Lolita Unclothed, a documentary by Camille Paglia, she has complained that in the novel Lolita has "no voice". The poems were set to music at the New Music Festival in Winnipeg in 1993 (composer: Sid Rabinovitch). Five poems from the book were selected for Mythic Women/Real Women (edited by Lizbeth Goodman), Faber & Faber's Women & Gender university textbook. Morrisey also dealt with the theme of ephebophilia in her stage play about Sigmund Freud's Dora case.

== Works ==
- Batoche – 1989
- Poems for Men Who Dream of Lolita – 1992
- Dora: A Case of Hysteria – 1994
- Clever as Paint: The Rossettis in Love – 1998
- Mrs. Ruskin – 2003

== See also ==
- List of Canadian poets
- List of Canadian playwrights
