= Charles Edward Perugini =

Italian painter (1839–1918)

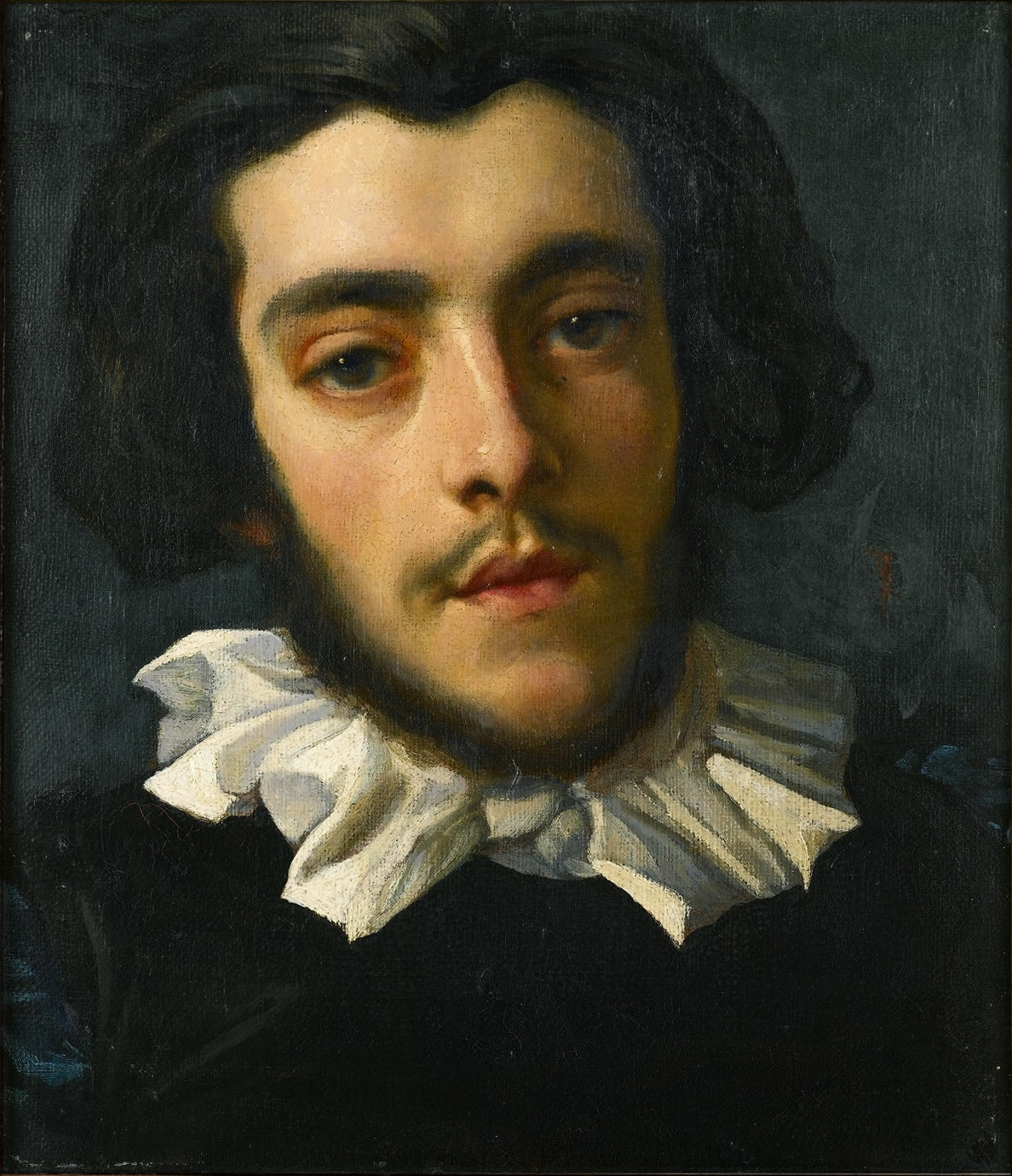
Charles Edward Perugini painted by Lord Frederic Leighton in 1855

Charles Edward Perugini (1 September 1839 – 22 December 1918), originally Carlo Perugini, was an Italian-born English painter of the Romantic and Victorian era.

== Biography ==
Perugini was born in Naples, but lived with his family in England from the ages of six to 17. He trained in Italy under Giuseppe Bonolis and Giuseppe Mancinelli, and in Paris under Ary Scheffer. He became a protégé of Lord Leighton, who brought him back to England in 1863. Perugini may at first have worked as Leighton's studio assistant. Under Leighton's influence, he began as a painter of classical scenes; then "he turned to the more profitable pastures of portrait painting, and genre pictures of pretty women and children."

In 1874, he married the youngest daughter of novelist Charles Dickens, who as Kate Perugini pursued her own artistic career, sometimes collaborating with her husband. Perugini's 1878 picture A Girl Reading, perhaps his best-known single work, is in the collection of the Manchester Art Gallery. It was bequeathed by James Thomas Blair in 1917.

Perugini's portrait of Sophie Gray, the sister-in-law of Pre-Raphaelite painter Sir John Everett Millais, was for many years mistaken for a work by Millais himself.

Perugini and his wife maintained an active social life in artistic circles of their era. He died in London. He was 79 years old.

== Works ==
- A Girl Reading (1878; Manchester Art Gallery)
- Orange Blossoms (1879)
- Faithful (1879; Walker Art Gallery, Liverpool)
- Tender Cares (1880)
- Idle Moments (before 1885)
- A Summer Shower (1888; Ferens Art Gallery, Hull)
- 'The Highborn Ladye-Moore' (Untraced)
- La Superba (Untraced)
- Graziella
- A Backward Glance

== Gallery (selected) ==
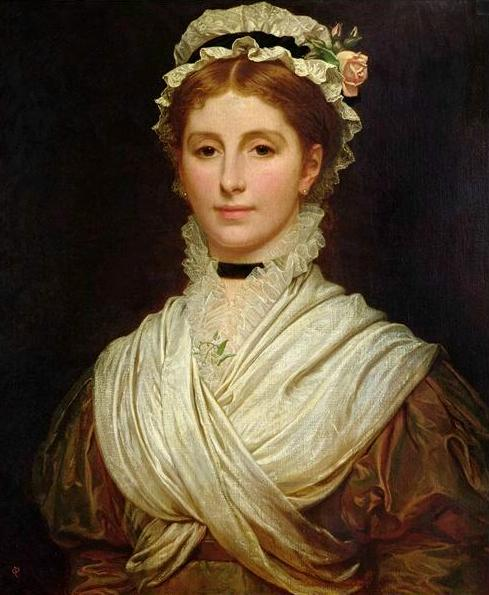
Perugini's portrait of his wife Kate

The Rivals, 1876

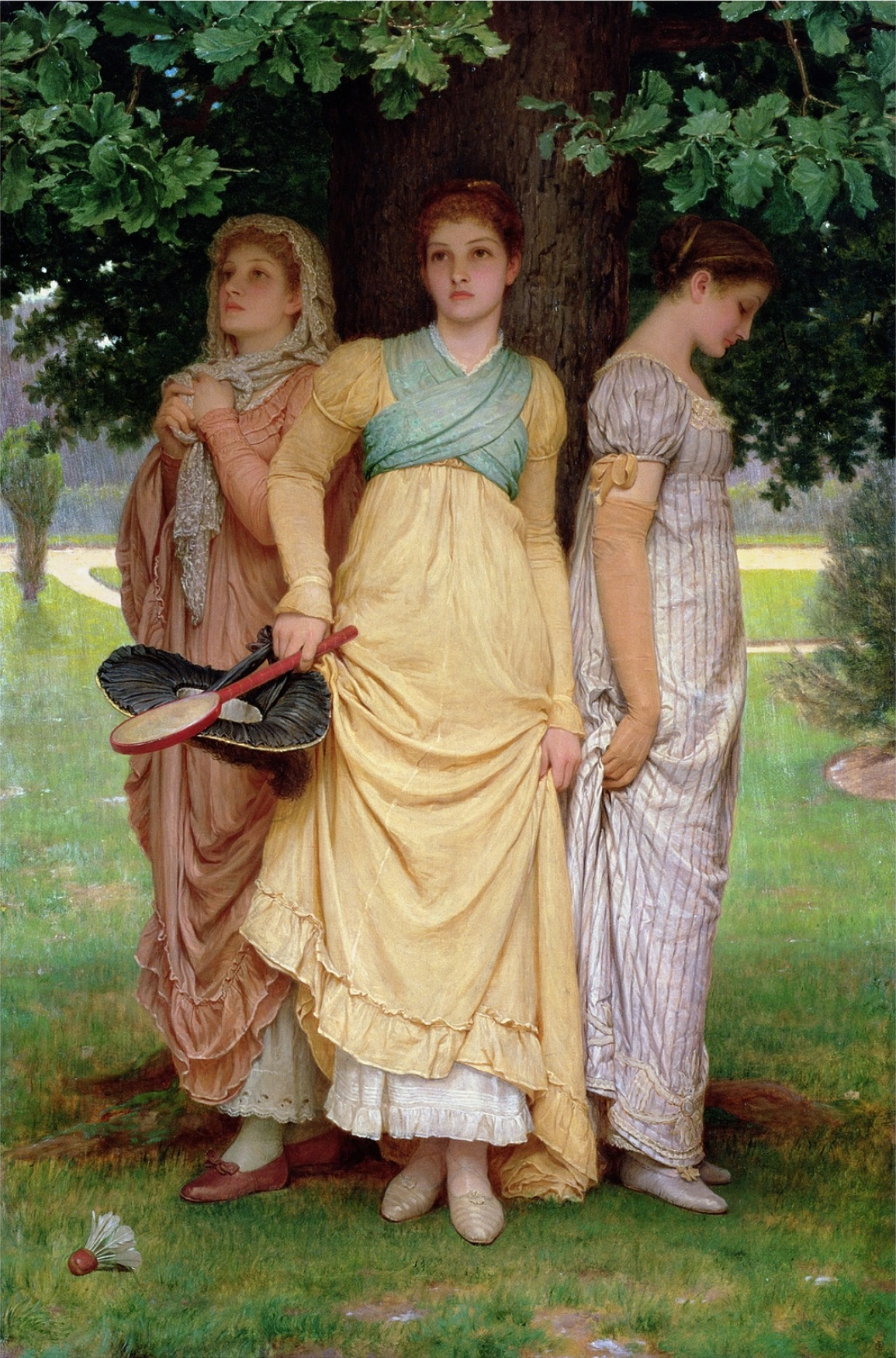
A Summer Shower

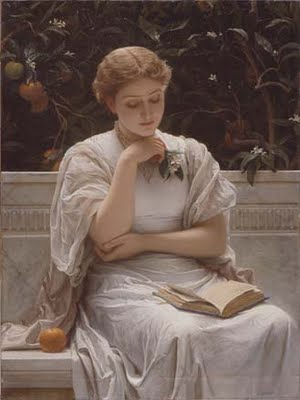
A Girl Reading

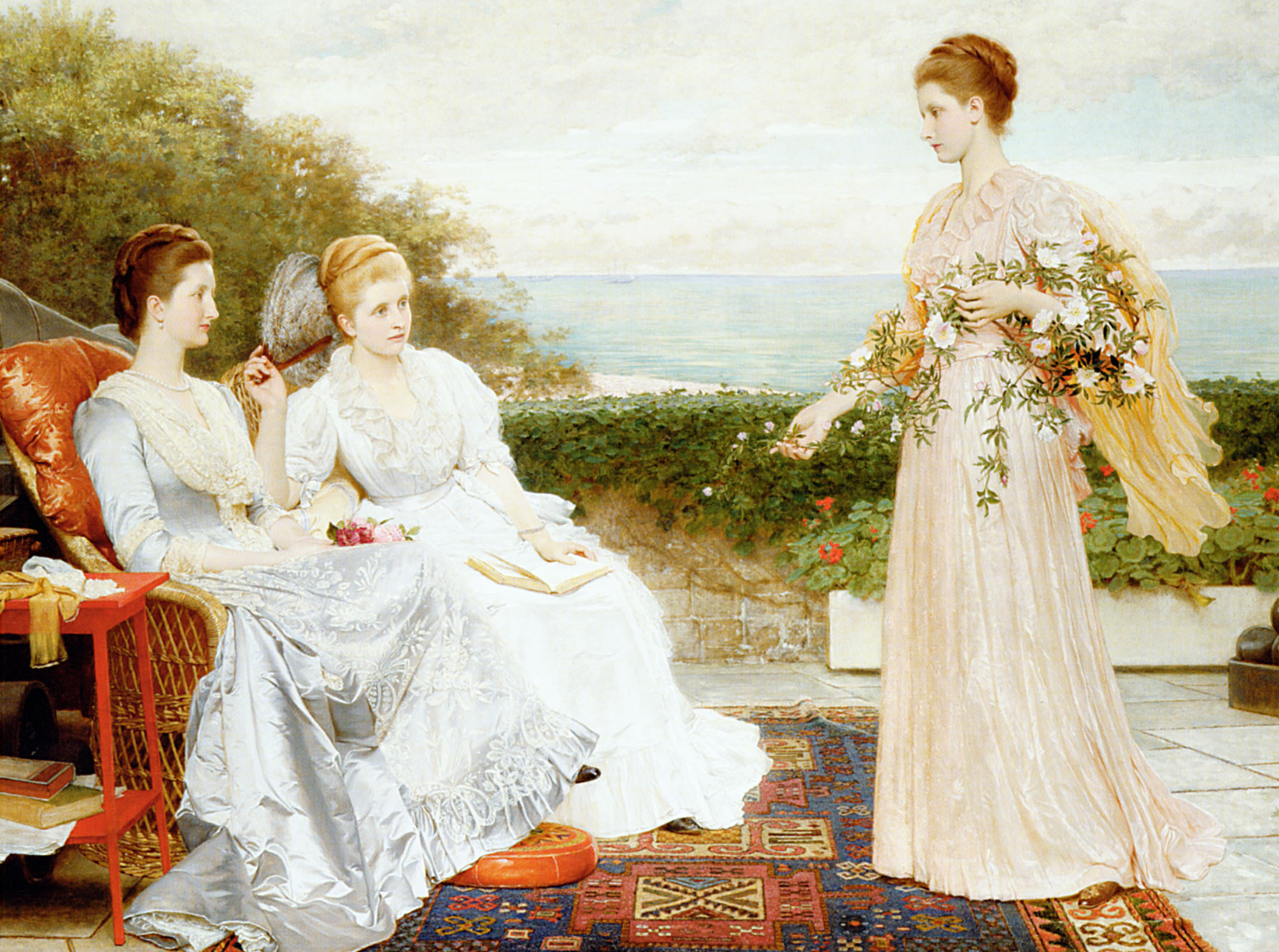
The Ramparts, Walmer Castle; Portraits of the Countess Granville, and the Ladies Victoria and Mary Leveson-Gower

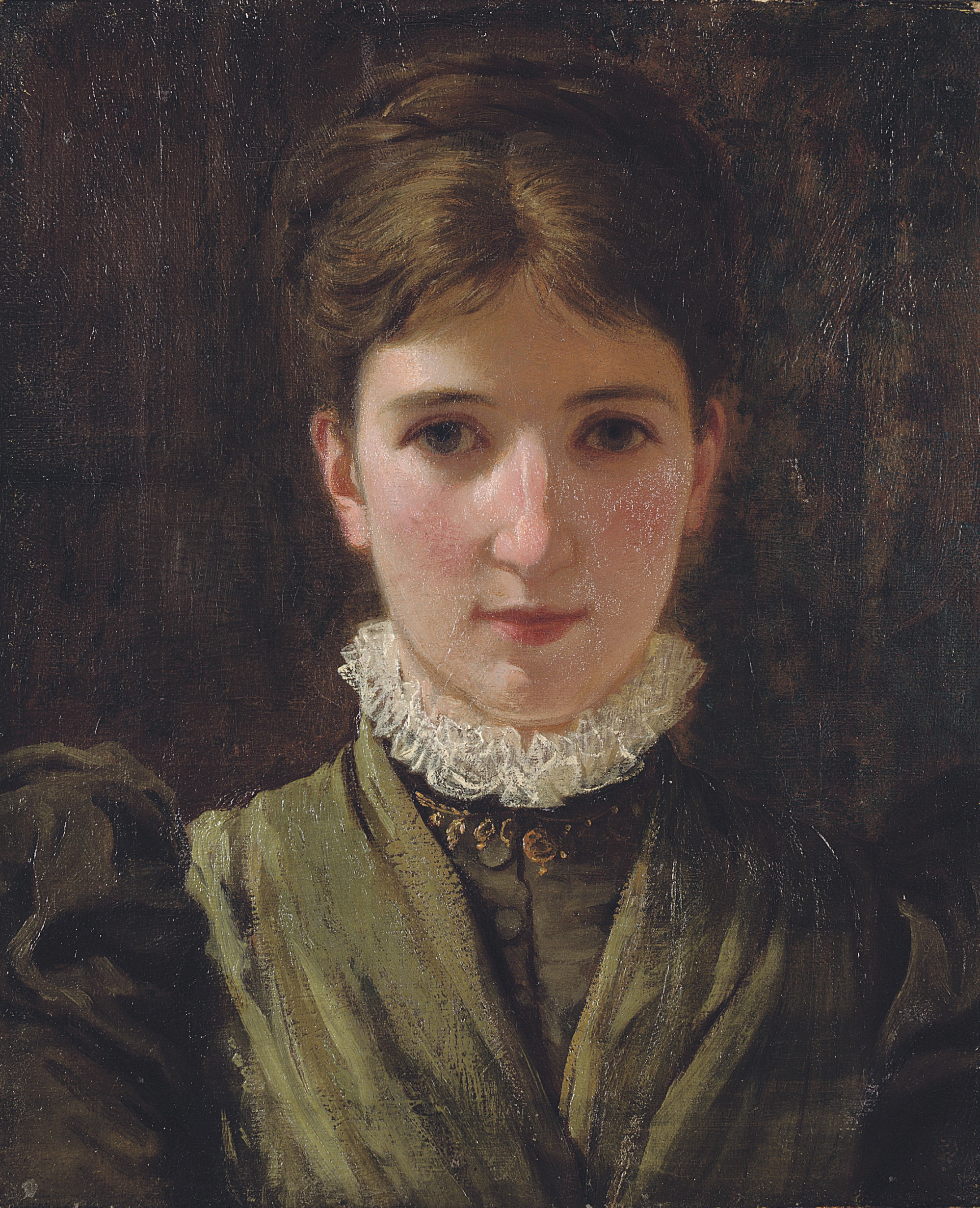
Portrait of Sophia Gray
