= Effie Gray (film) =

2014 British biographical film

- Film poster, featuring Fanning with Millais's painting Ophelia behind her.
- Directed by: Richard Laxton
- Written by: Emma Thompson
- Produced by: Andreas Roald; Donald Rosenfeld
- Starring: Dakota Fanning; Emma Thompson; Tom Sturridge; David Suchet; Julie Walters; Greg Wise; Claudia Cardinale; Robbie Coltrane; James Fox; Riccardo Scamarcio; Derek Jacobi; Polly Dartford
- Cinematography: Andrew Dunn
- Edited by: Kate Williams
- Music by: Paul Cantelon
- Production company: Sovereign Films
- Distributed by: Metrodome Distribution (United Kingdom); Universal Pictures Home Entertainment (International)
- Release date: 5 October 2014
- Running time: 108 minutes
- Country: United Kingdom
- Language: English
- Budget: $11 million
- Box office: $721,143

Effie Gray is a 2014 British biographical film written by Emma Thompson and directed by Richard Laxton, starring Dakota Fanning, Emma Thompson, Tom Sturridge, David Suchet, Julie Walters, Greg Wise, Claudia Cardinale, Robbie Coltrane, James Fox and Derek Jacobi. It is based on the true story of John Ruskin's marriage to Euphemia Gray and the subsequent annulment of their marriage.

Effie Gray was released worldwide by Universal Pictures in the United Kingdom on 10 October 2014 and in America on 3 April 2015.

== Plot ==
In a pre-credit sequence Euphemia "Effie" Gray is seen walking through a garden speaking to her younger sister, Sophie, about a fairy story in which a girl married a man with wicked parents.

Effie marries the prosperous art critic and philosopher John Ruskin in Perth, Scotland. They travel to London to stay with his parents. Effie soon begins to feel isolated, especially as she is repeatedly belittled by Ruskin's hardhearted mother. Her distress is compounded by the fact that her husband shows no interest in consummating the marriage and refuses to discuss the subject.

At the Royal Academy of Arts, Ruskin and Effie attend a dinner at which there is heated debate about the new Pre-Raphaelite movement in art, which Ruskin supports. He convinces Sir Charles Eastlake, the president of the academy, to allow the young artists to exhibit their pictures.

Effie attracts the attention of Sir Charles's wife, Elizabeth. When the Eastlakes visit the Ruskins, Elizabeth sees how distressed Effie is in the repressive atmosphere of the Ruskin family. Feeling pressured due to the encounter with the Eastlakes, Ruskin calls in a doctor to examine Effie.

Effie hopes that matters will improve when they travel to Venice, where Ruskin will be researching his new book The Stones of Venice but when they get there, he busies himself studying the many historic monuments of the city, leaving Effie in the company of Raffaele, a young Italian. Effie enjoys the city life, but is distressed when Raffaele tries to force himself on her. Her husband is oblivious to the situation.

Effie dreads returning to the Ruskin family. Back at their house she suffers from a string of nervous ailments. Her doctor expresses disgust at Ruskin's clear lack of care or concern toward Effie and is horrified to learn that he has been doping her with laudanum, albeit unintentionally, as his mother gave him the tonics. He chastises a guilty looking Ruskin for his ignorance. He advises fresh air and more attention from her husband. Ruskin says they intend to travel to Edinburgh where John Everett Millais, one of the Pre-Raphaelites, will paint his portrait. Millais befriends Effie and becomes increasingly disturbed by Ruskin's dismissive attitude to his wife. He is deeply embarrassed when Ruskin leaves the two of them alone together for several nights when he visits Edinburgh. Effie and Millais fall in love. He convinces her to take someone she trusts with her and to explore the options for divorce.

Effie sends for Sophie, claiming that her sister wants to see the capital city. Together they visit Elizabeth Eastlake. Effie tells her she is still a virgin and that Ruskin told her he was disgusted by her body on their wedding night. Elizabeth advises her to get legal advice, as Ruskin clearly has no desire to fulfill any of his obligations in the marriage, and Effie does not deserve the type of treatment she is receiving.

Effie is examined by a doctor, who confirms her virginity. Her sympathetic lawyer tells her the marriage can be annulled. She leaves for Perth, supposedly to accompany her sister, but really to leave Ruskin forever. Before she leaves London, she visits Millais, but communicates with him only via her sister. He says he will wait for her. Ruskin's family is horrified when Effie's lawyer calls round with a notification of annulment proceedings on the grounds of John Ruskin's impotence.

== Cast ==
- Dakota Fanning as Euphemia "Effie" Gray
  - Tiger George as Young Euphemia "Effie"
- Greg Wise as John Ruskin
- Emma Thompson as Lady Eastlake
- Julie Walters as Margaret Cox Ruskin
- David Suchet as John James Ruskin
- Derek Jacobi as Travers Twiss
- Robbie Coltrane as the Doctor
- Claudia Cardinale as Viscountess
- James Fox as Sir Charles Eastlake
- Tom Sturridge as John Everett Millais
- Russell Tovey as "George" Gray
- Riccardo Scamarcio as Raffaele
- Polly Dartford as Sophia "Sophie" Margaret Gray
- Linda Bassett as Anna the Housemaid
- Pip Torrens as A Member of the Royal Academy

== Lawsuits ==
The release of the film, originally titled Effie, was delayed by a series of court actions. Eve Pomerance, author of two scripts on the same subject as Thompson's screenplay, brought the first case. One of the scripts had been produced as a stage play. The judge ruled in December 2012 that Thompson's script was not in breach of copyright and could be released. Another copyright dispute arose, with playwright Gregory Murphy, author of the play The Countess which had been positively received and ran Off-Broadway for 634 performances during the 1999/00 season. The matter was decided in Thompson's favour in March 2013. The judge's ruling was based on a second, revised screenplay that the court allowed Thompson to submit in the middle of the case, which Murphy called "unprecedented". Murphy appealed the ruling, but the Second Circuit rejected the appeal. The District Court then ordered Murphy to reimburse Effie Film, LLC $500,000 for its legal fees. Murphy filed an appeal, but in debt for hundreds of thousands of dollars as a result of the initial lawsuit instigated by Effie Film, petitioned the Court for pro bono counsel. Lawyers representing Effie Film successfully blocked Murphy's petition, and filed a motion that Murphy be required to put up a bond of $125,000 before his case could be heard on appeal. In the year-long court battle that ensued, Murphy, representing himself, fought both the $500,000 fee award and the $125,000 bond motion. The case was eventually moved to the Court of Appeals. On 16 October 2015 the three-judge panel for the Court of Appeals ruled unanimously in Murphy's favour, dismissing the motion for a bond requirement and ruling that the District Court had "abused its discretion" in awarding Effie Film $500,000 in legal fees, adding that the Court of Appeals had never characterized Murphy's original claims of infringement as "frivolous" or "objectively unreasonable" as contended. The Court of Appeals also ordered Effie Film, LLC to pay Murphy $603.80 for his court costs.

The release date was put back to October 2013, but the film was withdrawn from the Mill Valley Film Festival in California at which it was to be premiered under the title Effie Gray. In December 2013, Thompson said the film's time had "probably passed". The film was finally released in October 2014. Thompson did not attend its London premiere, nor did she promote the film.

== Reception ==
Effie Gray has received mixed reviews from critics. On Rotten Tomatoes, the film has a rating of 42%, based on 79 reviews, with an average rating of 5.6/10. The site's critical consensus reads, "Effie Gray benefits from its strong cast, elevating a period drama that doesn't strike quite as many narrative sparks as it could." On Metacritic, the film has a score of 54 out of 100, based on 28 critics, indicating "mixed or average reviews".

Mark Kermode said that the film "intelligently dramatises the prison-like nature of Effie's status while struggling to engage us in what is essentially a non-relationship...we have a handsome but rather inert portrait of a suffocating social milieu in which it is left to Thompson herself to inject vibrant relief as the independently minded Lady Eastlake." Tim Robey in The Telegraph said that "There are clever and sensitive touches right through, and a moving ending. But Fanning seems wholly uncomfortable, and not always intentionally. She's meant to be playing a trapped Pre-Raphaelite muse, frequently ill and/or sedated, but moons her way through the film seeming mostly dazed and confused."

David Sexton, in contrast, praised Fanning's performance as "remarkably good", but objected to the caricatured portrait of Ruskin and what he called the "Everyday Feminism" of the portrayal of Effie as a victim. Stephen Dalton in The Hollywood Reporter was unflattering, calling the film "an exquisitely dreary slice of middlebrow armchair theater which adds little new to a much-filmed story. Despite a lurid plot involving sex scandal, family dysfunction and proto-feminist revolt, the end result is depressingly conventional and deadeningly tasteful...yet another surface-level rehash of Victorian costume-drama clichés." However, Fanning's "wounded, emotionally conflicted performance" was praised.
