= The Countess (play) =

1995 play by Gregory Murphy

- Poster for the original production of The Countess at the Greenwich Street Theatre (signed by the author and members of the cast)
- Original language: English
- Written by: Gregory Murphy
- Subject: Ruskin's marriage breaks down when his wife Effie meets artist John Everett Millais
- Genre: Period piece
- Setting: London and Scotland in the 1850s

Premiere
- Date: 1999
- Place: Greenwich Street Theatre, New York City

The Countess is a play written by the American playwright and novelist Gregory Murphy. It recounts the break-up of the marriage of John Ruskin and Effie Gray, one of the greatest scandals of the Victorian era in Britain.

Written in 1995, Murphy's two-act drama premiered in New York in 1999, and transferred twice to ever-larger Off-Broadway venues. It later had a successful run in London's West End, and has since been performed worldwide.

== Characters ==
- John Ruskin
- Effie Ruskin
- Elizabeth, Lady Eastlake
- John Everett Millais
- Mrs Ruskin
- Mr. Ruskin
- Crawley

== Plot ==
Based on one of the most notorious affairs of the Victorian Age, The Countess is a play about the idealization and oppression of women. In 1853, the preeminent author and art critic John Ruskin, his wife, Effie Gray, and his friend and protégé, the Pre-Raphaelite Brotherhood painter John Everett Millais, depart in high spirits for the Scottish Highlands. When they return to London four months later, Millais' hatred for Ruskin is only exceeded by his passion for the beautiful, young Mrs. Ruskin. What Millais did not know was the truth at the core of the Ruskin marriage, a secret, which when revealed through the persistence of Effie Ruskin's friend Lady Elizabeth Eastlake, renowned writer of the period, would rock London society and change forever the lives of Millais and the Ruskins.

== Productions ==
The play, directed by Ludovica Villar-Hauser, was first performed in 1999 at the Greenwich Street Theatre, New York City. It soon transferred to the Samuel Beckett Theatre, and finally to the much larger Lamb's Theatre. The production ran for 634 performances and was the longest-running play on or off Broadway in the 1999–2000 season. The original production of the play starred Jennifer Woodward as Effie Ruskin, James Riordan as John Ruskin, Jy Murphy (no relation to the playwright) as John Everett Millais, Kristin Griffith as Lady Eastlake, Honora Fergusson as Mrs. Ruskin, Frederick Neumann as Mr. Ruskin and John Quilty as Crawley.

In 2005, Villar-Hauser directed the West End production of The Countess, which began at Guildford's Yvonne Arnaud Theatre, before transferring to the Criterion Theatre. Alison Pargeter starred as Effie Ruskin, Nick Moran as John Ruskin, Damian O'Hare as John Everett Millais, Linda Thorson as Lady Eastlake, Jean Boht as Mrs. Ruskin, Gerald Harper as Mr. Ruskin and Edmund Kente as Crawley.

The Countess was published by Dramatists Play Service in 2000. Gregory Murphy wrote a screenplay The Countess based on his play.

Poster for the 2003 production of The Countess in Tokyo

== Reception ==
The Countess received critical acclaim when it premiered in the spring of 1999 with the New York Times calling the play "…serious…wonderfully witty…erotically charged." "splendidly directed" and "the entire cast is excellent". Some critics of the London production were less impressed. Michael Billington called it "curiously stolid" and objected to what he called the "forelock-tugging framing device, set in Windsor Castle" in which Effie meets Queen Victoria. Ian Shuttleworth also objected to the "clunky" framing scenes, writing that the play "is a standard triangular story with several cumbersome attempts to spice it up." Tim Walker of The Sunday Telegraph, however, called The Countess “a wonderful, evocative piece of theatre,” and Emma Whitelaw of indieLondon wrote that it was a “marvelous production,” calling Nick Moran's portrayal of John Ruskin “sublime.”

The Countess sparked some debate over its depiction of John Ruskin, and the resulting controversy led the New York Times to publish "A Twisted Victorian Love Tale That Won't Die Out" written by Lucinda Franks. Billington said that "Murphy takes the stock line that Ruskin was a domestic bully who pontificated about art and beauty while recoiling from living flesh", but the play gave no indication of Ruskin's radical political ideas.

Margo Jefferson, theatre critic for The New York Times in her essay REVISIONS; Lurking Behind the Victorian Propriety, Wit and Pluck. wrote: The Countess, by Gregory Murphy, reminds us of the terrifying imbalance of power between those who claim adult authority and those they treat like children ... It is a revisionist drama, since Ruskin's wife, Effie, was seen for years as one of those people who surround a genius and have no real needs, privileges or rights that he is bound to respect ... The scene in which Effie confesses [the non-consummation of her marriage] to her friend Lady Eastlake is harrowing. She thinks she has a disease that cannot be named and she can barely get the words out ... Mr. Murphy centers on Effie, and gives a full-bodied portrait of a woman who was generally seen as too worldly and shallow for such a great man. Here she is restless, quick and at odds with herself, and very much our contemporary. But The Countess does something harder, Mr. Murphy gives us a Ruskin whom we can pity as well as rage against for betraying the ideals he claimed to be teaching us.”

== Plagiarism dispute ==
In 2010, The Countess generated its own scandal, when Gregory Murphy became embroiled in a protracted and very public lawsuit with actress and screenwriter Emma Thompson, who had written a screenplay Effie Gray based on the same historical events. Murphy said Thompson's screenplay was an infringement on his play and screenplay The Countess, which he claimed he had submitted to Thompson through a mutual friend in 2003 to consider the role of Lady Elizabeth Eastlake in a proposed film of his play, and to Thompson's husband Greg Wise to consider the role of John Ruskin in the play's 2005 West End production. In 2008, Emma Thompson announced that she and Wise “had written a script together about John Ruskin, the Victorian art critic, which we want to make into a film." After meeting with Emma Thompson and her producers Potboiler Productions, Murphy was offered a screenwriting fee and co-screenwriting credit with Thompson in settlement of his claim. This settlement offer was later abandoned by Emma Thompson, Greg Wise and their partner Donald Rosenfeld, when their company Sovereign Films took over production of the film and instigated the suit, creating the independent entity Effie Film, LLC, spearheaded by Rosenfeld, to litigate it. In March 2013, District Court Judge Thomas P. Griesa, after allowing Thompson to submit a second revised screenplay into evidence, from which Murphy claimed "some of the most troubling material" had been removed, ruled that while there were similarities, the screenplays were "quite dissimilar in their two approaches to fictionalizing the same historical events". In response to Murphy's attorney's concerns that the completed film Effie Gray would not adhere to Thompson's second revised screenplay, Judge Griesa concluded his ruling by saying that Thompson's film would not infringe Murphy's play or screenplay "only to the extent that it does not substantially deviate from the November 29, 2011 screenplay," the date of Thompson's second revised screenplay. In May 2013, Effie Gray’s Cannes Film Festival premiere was cancelled. In October 2013, the film was withdrawn from the Mill Valley Film Festival in California due to "unforeseen circumstances" according to producer Rosenfeld. In December 2013, Thompson said of the still unreleased Effie Gray that its "time has probably passed," comparing it to another project of hers that "didn't happen either." Effie Gray was released in October 2014, to a modest reception. Thompson plays Lady Elizabeth Eastlake and Greg Wise plays John Ruskin in the film, which they both declined to promote. Camilla Long reviewing Effie Gray in The Sunday Times wrote “nothing fits together” and “no one seems to know why they made this film. Where is Thompson’s passion and commitment, or any hint of what she intended to achieve.” Manohla Dargis in her review in The New York Times called Effie Gray “The cinematic equivalent of a Brazilian wax, the movie omits much of the story’s most interesting material to create something that’s been smoothly denatured.”
