= Alice Gray (science blogger) =

Welsh science writer (born 1992)

- Born: February 1992 (age 34)
- Occupation: Science writer
- Notable work: Mindful of Science

Alice Gray BSc, FLSW (born 1992) is a Welsh science writer, who writes the blog Mindful of Science. She was recognized by the BBC's 100 Women in 2015 for her work advocating for the representation of women in STEM fields. She was recognized as one of the BBC's 100 women of 2021.

== Early life and education ==
Gray was born in 1992. She has an identical twin sister, and was raised near Amroth, Pembrokeshire, Wales.

Gray received a BSc in Neuroscience from Cardiff University in 2013.

== Career ==
Gray started the blog Mindful of Science in 2013. The "STEMinist" blog discusses issues facing women in science, technology, engineering, and maths (STEM), arguing for the importance of diversity and representation in science and for removing barriers to women's advancement in STEM education and careers. Gray credits the blog with having given her opportunities to further advocate for women in STEM to governmental agencies and organizations.

She also produces a podcast (Inside the Petri Dish), and a YouTube video series (Gray Matter), which address contemporary and popular science topics.

In interviews, Gray has mentioned a book project in progress, titled Women in White Coats, focused on the true stories of women in STEM.

== Awards and honours ==
In 2015, Gray was recognized by the BBC's 100 Women for her science writing.

She was recognized as one of the BBC's 100 women of 2021.

In 2023, Gray was elected a Fellow of the Learned Society of Wales.
