= Peace Concluded =

1856 painting by John Everet Millais

Peace Concluded, 1856
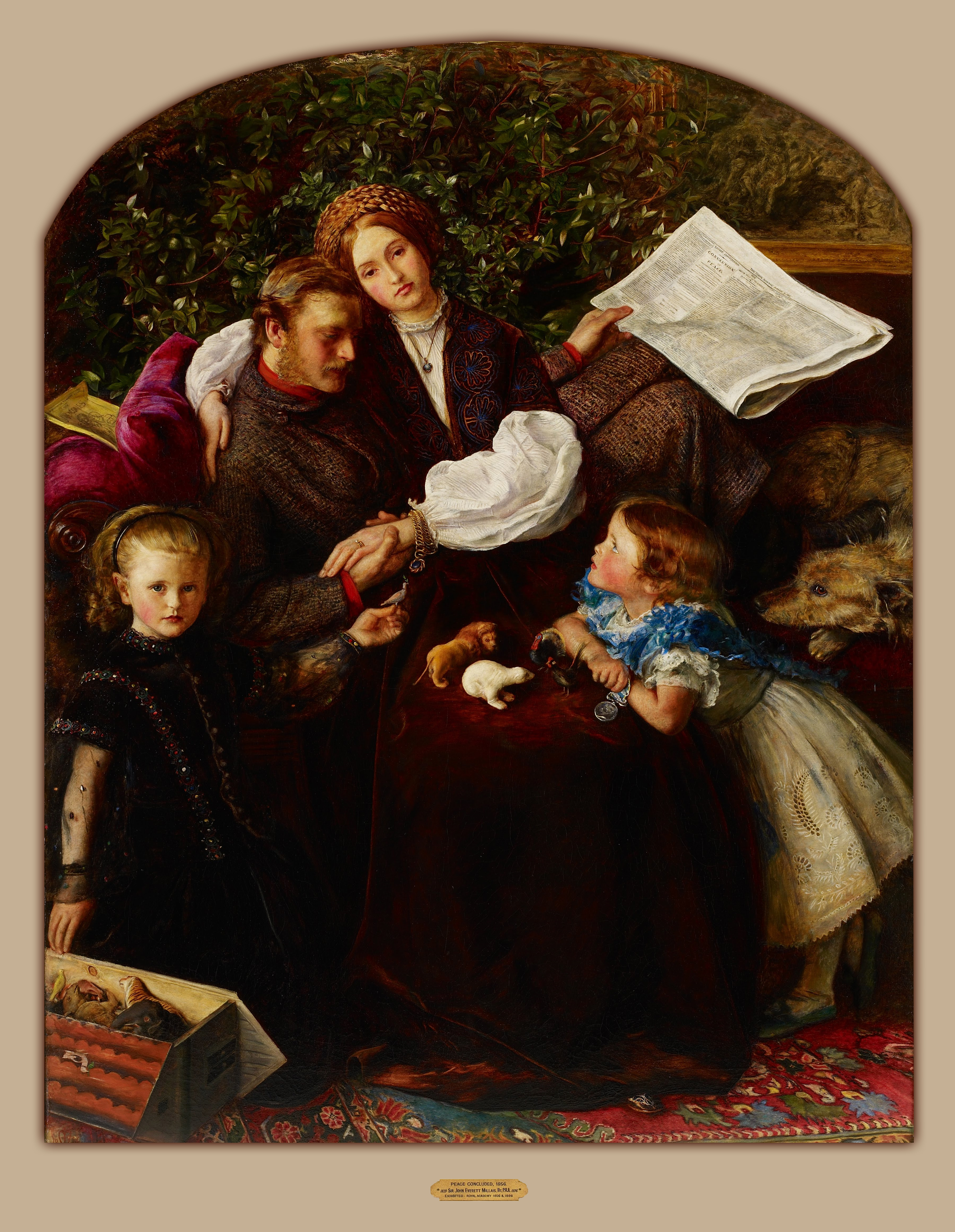
- Artist: John Everett Millais
- Year: 1856
- Medium: Oil on canvas
- Dimensions: 120 cm × 91 cm (46 in × 36 in)
- Location: Minneapolis Institute of Arts, Minneapolis

Peace Concluded, 1856 (1856) is a painting by John Everett Millais which depicts a wounded British officer reading The Times newspaper's report of the end of the Crimean War. It was exhibited at the Royal Academy in 1856 to mixed reviews, but was strongly endorsed by the critic John Ruskin who proclaimed that in the future it would be recognised as "among the world's best masterpieces". The central figure in the painting is a portrait of Millais's wife Effie Gray, who had previously been married to Ruskin. It is now in the Minneapolis Institute of Arts.

== Subject ==
There is some evidence that Millais originally intended the painting to be satirical – an attack on pampered officers who were allowed to go home for so-called "urgent private affairs", while ordinary soldiers were forced to live in poor conditions in the Crimea. When the war ended, the satire seemed obsolete, so he changed it to a portrayal of a wounded officer recuperating at home.

The officer is depicted lying with an Irish Wolfhound at his feet, while his wife rests on the sofa, and partly on his lap; behind her head a large myrtle bush sprouts, a traditional symbol of marital fidelity. He has put aside a chapter of William Makepeace Thackeray's novel The Newcomes (the yellow booklet behind his head), which shares the story of a pious military man and his family, to read the newspaper.

The two children have been playing with a wooden box in the form of Noah's Ark, a popular toy in this period. It contains models of various animals, some of which have been placed on the mother's lap. Each animal symbolises one of the combatants in the Crimean war. The Gallic rooster is the symbol of France; the lion of Britain; the bear of Russia; the turkey of the Ottoman empire (based in Turkey). The child at the left has just picked a dove from the box, symbolising peace. The rich fabric of the mother's dress creates a large red patch under the toys, suggestive of blood. The girl on the right holds up her father's campaign medal, looking at him questioningly.

In the background is a print by James Heath of The Death of Major Peirson by John Singleton Copley, depicting the death of a British officer defending Jersey (Millais's family home) during the Battle of Jersey (1781).

== Reception ==
Ruskin's elaborate praise of the painting emphasised Millais's increasing mastery of colour, which the critic compared to Titian. Other critics were less impressed. An opponent of the Pre-Raphaelites stated that the "coats, hats, trousers" all had more vitality than the people. Some of Millais's Pre-Raphaelite colleagues also disliked the picture. Critics were also befuddled as to the physical and apparent emotional closeness of the parents. "The agroupment [sic] of the two principle (sic) figures, although probable incident, is not easy. We first lost the extremities of the husband and have to look for them beyond the wife, and then the question arises as to what she is seated on--being upheld by a supposition that she occupies a mysterious space at the edge of the sofa." Upon further research it is possible that part of their closeness represents the closeness of Millais and Gray, as the painting and their first anniversary share the same date. There is evidence that this was not the first time that Millais has inserted his own personal life into one of his paintings.

== See also ==
- List of paintings by John Everett Millais
