= Effie Gray =

British artists' model and wife (1828–1897)

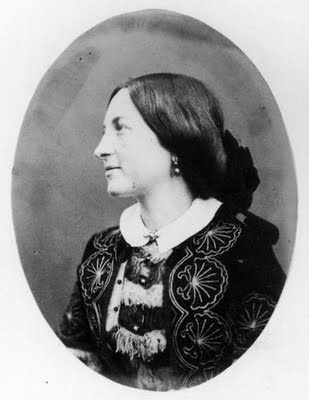
- Effie Millais c. 1860
- Born: Euphemia Chalmers Gray; 7 May 1828; Perth, Scotland
- Died: 23 December 1897 (aged 69); Perth, Scotland
- Spouses: John Ruskin (m. 1848; ann. 1854) Sir John Everett Millais, 1st Baronet (m. 1855; died 1896)
- Children: 8, including John Guille Millais
- Relatives: Sophie Gray (younger sister)

Euphemia Chalmers Millais, Lady Millais (née Gray; 7 May 1828 – 23 December 1897) was a British artists' model who was married to Pre-Raphaelite painter John Everett Millais. She had previously married the art critic John Ruskin, but she left him with the marriage never having been consummated; it was subsequently annulled. This love triangle has been dramatised in plays, films, and an opera.

== Early life ==
Euphemia Chalmers Gray was born on 7 May 1828 in Perth, Perthshire, Scotland to lawyer and businessman George Gray (1798–1877) and Sophia Margaret (1808–1894), daughter of Andrew Jameson, Sheriff-substitute of Fife. She grew up at Bowerswell, an Italianate-style house near the foot of Kinnoull Hill. Though she was given the pet-name "Phemy" by her parents as a child, she started to be known as "Effie" by the time she was a teenager. Her sisters Sophie and Alice often modelled for John Everett Millais.

Between 1842 and 1844 she attended Avonbank school run by the Misses Byerley near Stratford on Avon, Warwickshire, England, partly as her parents wanted her to lose her Scottish accent. She was an assiduous student at Avonbank winning prizes in every year but was taken out of school to be a support to her mother when her siblings died of scarlet fever.

== Relationship with John Ruskin ==
John Ruskin wrote the fantasy story The King of the Golden River for Gray in 1841, when she was 12 and he was 21. Gray's family knew Ruskin's father and encouraged a match between the two when she had matured. After an initially unsteady courtship, she married Ruskin on 10 April 1848; she was 19 years old. During their honeymoon, they travelled to Venice, where Ruskin was doing research for his book The Stones of Venice. While in Perth, they lived at Bowerswell, the Gray family home, and site of their wedding. It had, coincidentally, previously been the home of Ruskin's paternal grandparents. In 1817, Ruskin's mother, Margaret, during her engagement to Ruskin's father, had stayed at Bowerswell and was witness to three tragic deaths within its walls in quick succession (Ruskin's grandmother, grandfather, and newborn cousin). This caused her to develop a severe phobia concerning Bowerswell, keeping her from attending her son's wedding to Gray.

Gray and Ruskin's different personalities were thrown into sharp relief by their contrasting priorities. For Gray, Venice provided an opportunity to socialise while Ruskin was engaged in solitary studies. In particular, he made a point of drawing the Ca' d'Oro and the Palazzo Ducale (Doge's Palace), because he feared they would soon be destroyed by the Austrian troops suppressing the separatist Republic of San Marco. One of the troops, Lieutenant Charles Paulizza, made friends with Gray, apparently with no objection from Ruskin. Her brother, amongst others, later said that Ruskin was deliberately encouraging the friendship in order to compromise her, as an excuse to separate.

When she met John Everett Millais five years later, Gray was still a virgin. Ruskin had persistently put off consummating the marriage. Gray and Ruskin had agreed upon abstaining from sex for five years to allow Ruskin to focus on his studies. Another reason involved his apparent disgust with some aspect of her body. As she later wrote to her father:

He alleged various reasons, hatred to children, religious motives, a desire to preserve my beauty, and, finally this last year he told me his true reason... that he had imagined women were quite different to what he saw I was, and that the reason he did not make me his Wife was because he was disgusted with my person the first evening.

Ruskin confirmed this in his statement to his lawyer during the annulment proceedings: "It may be thought strange that I could abstain from a woman who to most people was so attractive. But though her face was beautiful, her person was not formed to excite passion. On the contrary, there were certain circumstances in her person which completely checked it." The reason for Ruskin's disgust with "circumstances in her person" is unknown. Various suggestions have been made, including revulsion at either her pubic hair or menstrual blood. Robert Brownell, on the contrary, in his analysis Marriage of Inconvenience, argues that Ruskin's difficulty with the marriage was financial and related to concerns that Gray and her less affluent family were trying to tap into Ruskin's considerable wealth.

== Relationship with John Everett Millais ==
While married to Ruskin, Gray modelled for Millais' painting The Order of Release, in which she was depicted as the loyal wife of a Scottish rebel who has secured his release from prison. She then became close to Millais when he accompanied the couple on a trip to Scotland in order to paint Ruskin's portrait according to the critic's artistic principles. During this time, spent in Brig o' Turk in the Trossachs, they fell in love. While working on the portrait of her husband, Millais made many drawings and sketches of Gray. He also sent humorous cartoons of himself, Gray and Ruskin to friends. She copied some of his works.

After their return to London, Gray left Ruskin, ostensibly to visit her family. She sent back her wedding ring with a note announcing her intention to file for an annulment. With the support of her family and influential friends, she pursued the case, causing a public scandal. Their marriage was annulled on the grounds of "incurable impotency" in 1854.

=== Marriage to Millais ===
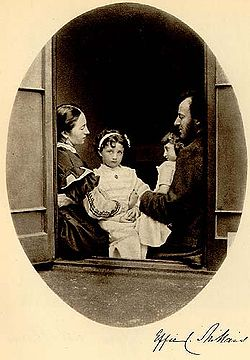
Albumen print photograph by Lewis Carroll from 21 July 1865 depicting Effie Gray, John Everett Millais, and their daughters Effie and Mary at 7 Cromwell Place, signed "Effie C. Millais"

In 1855, she married John Millais and they had eight children together: Everett, born in 1856; George, born in 1857; Effie, born in 1858; Mary, born in 1860; Alice, born in 1862; Geoffrey, born in 1863; John in 1865; and Sophie in 1868. Their youngest son, John Guille Millais, became a notable bird artist and gardener. Gray also modelled for a number of her husband's works, notably Peace Concluded (1856), which idealises her as an icon of beauty and fertility. In 1885, her husband was elevated to the baronetage by Queen Victoria, having been created Baronet Millais of Palace Gate, in the parish of St Mary Abbot, Kensington, in the county of Middlesex, and of Saint Ouen, in the Island of Jersey. Upon her husband's elevation, Effie became entitled to use the style Lady Millais.

=== Ruskin's relationship with Rose La Touche ===
In 1858, Ruskin met Rose La Touche; at the time she was 10 years old, and he became her teacher in drawing as well as other subjects. Ruskin became attracted to Rose and when she turned 18 sought to become engaged. Rose's parents were concerned and wrote to Gray, asking for her opinion of Ruskin as a husband. Her reply described him as "oppressive". The engagement was broken off.

=== Influence on Millais ===
Gray was an effective manager of Millais' career and often collaborated with him in choosing his subjects. Her journal indicates her high regard for her husband's art, and his works are still recognisably Pre-Raphaelite in style several years after his marriage.

However, Millais eventually abandoned the Pre-Raphaelite obsession with detail and began to paint in a looser style which produced more paintings for the time and effort. Many paintings were inspired by his family life with his wife, often using his children and grandchildren as models. Millais also used his sister-in-law, Sophie Gray, then in her early teens, as the basis of some striking images in the mid to late 1850s, provoking suggestions of a mutual infatuation.

== Later life and death ==
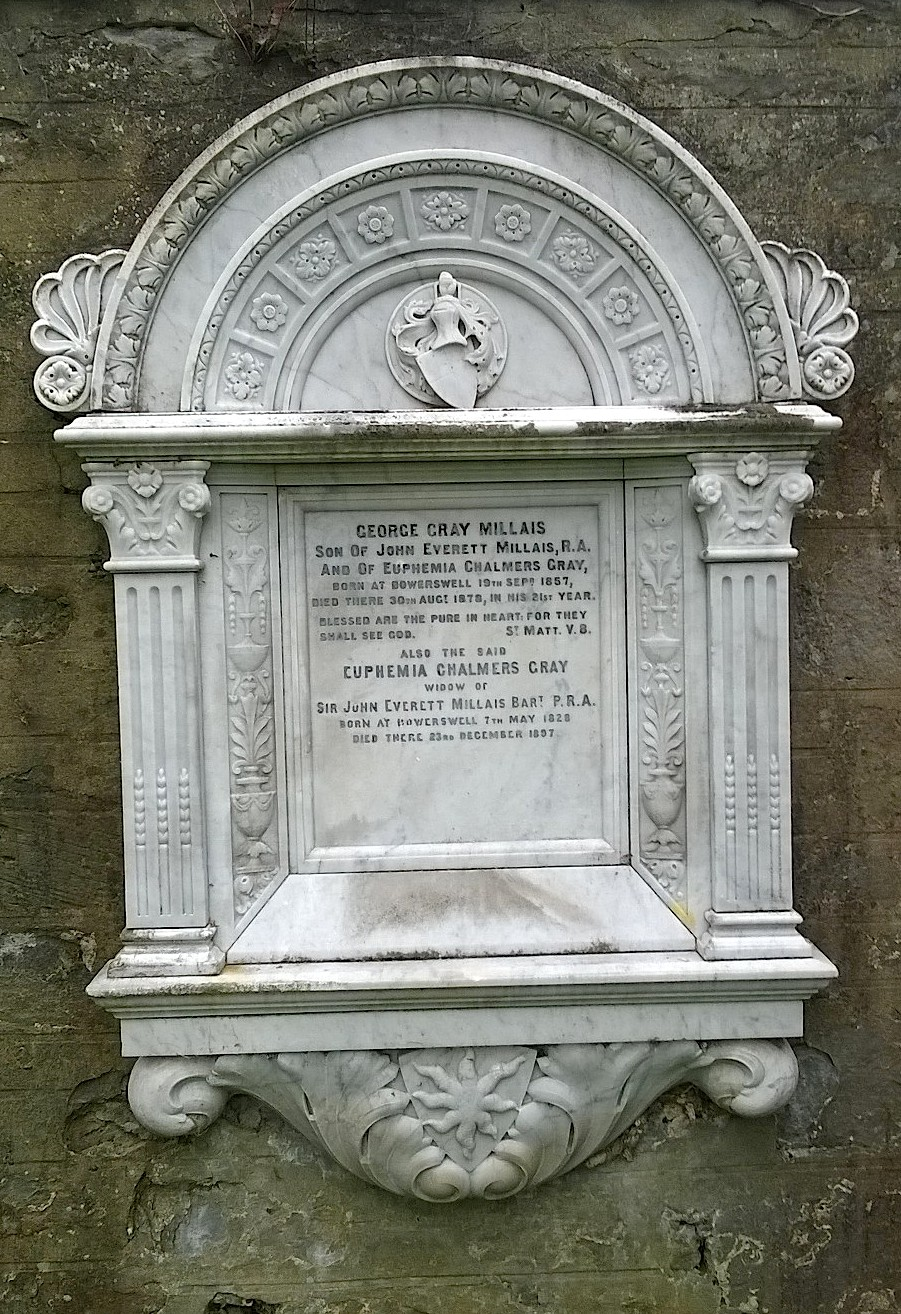
Effie's grave marker, which is shared with her son, George Gray Millais, in Perth, Scotland

Gray had been officially presented to Queen Victoria on 20 June 1850. This was arranged by Lady Davy, a friend and neighbour of hers from London who was also friends with one of the Queen's ladies-in-waiting. However, the annulment from Ruskin barred her from events at which the Queen was present. Her social status was affected negatively, although many in society were still prepared to receive her and to press her case sympathetically. Eventually, when Millais was dying, the Queen relented through the intervention of her daughter Princess Louise, allowing Gray to attend an official function.

Gray had an interest in local and family history, and corresponded with Perthshire historian Robert Scott Fittis, author of Sketches of the Olden Times in Perthshire (1878), about the Gray family history.

Sixteen months after Millais' death in August 1896, Gray died at Bowerswell on 23 December 1897. She was buried beside her son George, who died aged 21, in Kinnoull Parish churchyard, Perth, which is depicted in Millais's painting The Vale of Rest. Gray's father had donated the Millais window, the West window, to Kinnoull Church in 1870. It is based on designs drawn by Millais.

Her letters have been published posthumously in Effie in Venice: Her Picture of Society Life with John Ruskin, 1849-52 (1965) and The Order of Release: The Story of John Ruskin, Effie Gray and John Everett Millais Told for the First Time in their Unpublished Letters (1948).

== In drama and literature ==
Gray's marriage to Ruskin and subsequent romance with Millais have been dramatised on many occasions:

- The Love of John Ruskin (1912), a silent movie about Ruskin, Gray and Millais.
- The Love School (1975), a BBC series about the Pre-Raphaelites, starring Anne Kidd (Gray), David Collings (Ruskin), and Peter Egan (Millais).
- John Ruskin's Wife (1979), a novel about the relationship by Eva McDonald.
- Dear Countess (1983), a radio play by Elizabeth Morgan, with Derek Jacobi (Ruskin), Bridget McCann (Gray), Timothy West (Old Mr Ruskin) Michael Fenner (Millais). The author played Ruskin's mother.
- The Passion of John Ruskin (1994), a short film directed by Alex Chappel, starring Mark McKinney (Ruskin), Neve Campbell (Gray) and Colette Stevenson (Gray's voice).
- Modern Painters (1995), an opera about Ruskin, Gray and Millais, music by David Lang, libretto by Manuela Hoelterhoff.
- Parrots and Owls, (1994) a radio play by John Purser about the O'Shea brothers in which Gray appears as a friend of James O'Shea and her marital problems are discussed.
- The Countess (1995), a play written by Gregory Murphy concentrating on the breakdown of the marriage between Ruskin and Gray.
- The Order of Release (1998), a radio play by Robin Brooks about Ruskin (Bob Peck), Gray (Sharon Small) and Millais (David Tennant).
- The Woman Who Gave Birth to Rabbits (2002), a collection of short stories by Emma Donoghue, contains a story "Come, Gentle Night" about Ruskin and Gray's wedding night.
- Mrs Ruskin (2003), a play by Kim Morrissey about the breakdown of the marriage and Gray's fraught relationship with Ruskin's domineering mother.
- Desperate Romantics (2009), a six-part BBC television drama serial about the Pre-Raphaelite Brotherhood. She is played by Zoe Tapper.
- Effie Gray (2014), a film produced by Emma Thompson with Dakota Fanning as the eponymous character, Tom Sturridge as Millais and Greg Wise as Ruskin.

== Gallery ==
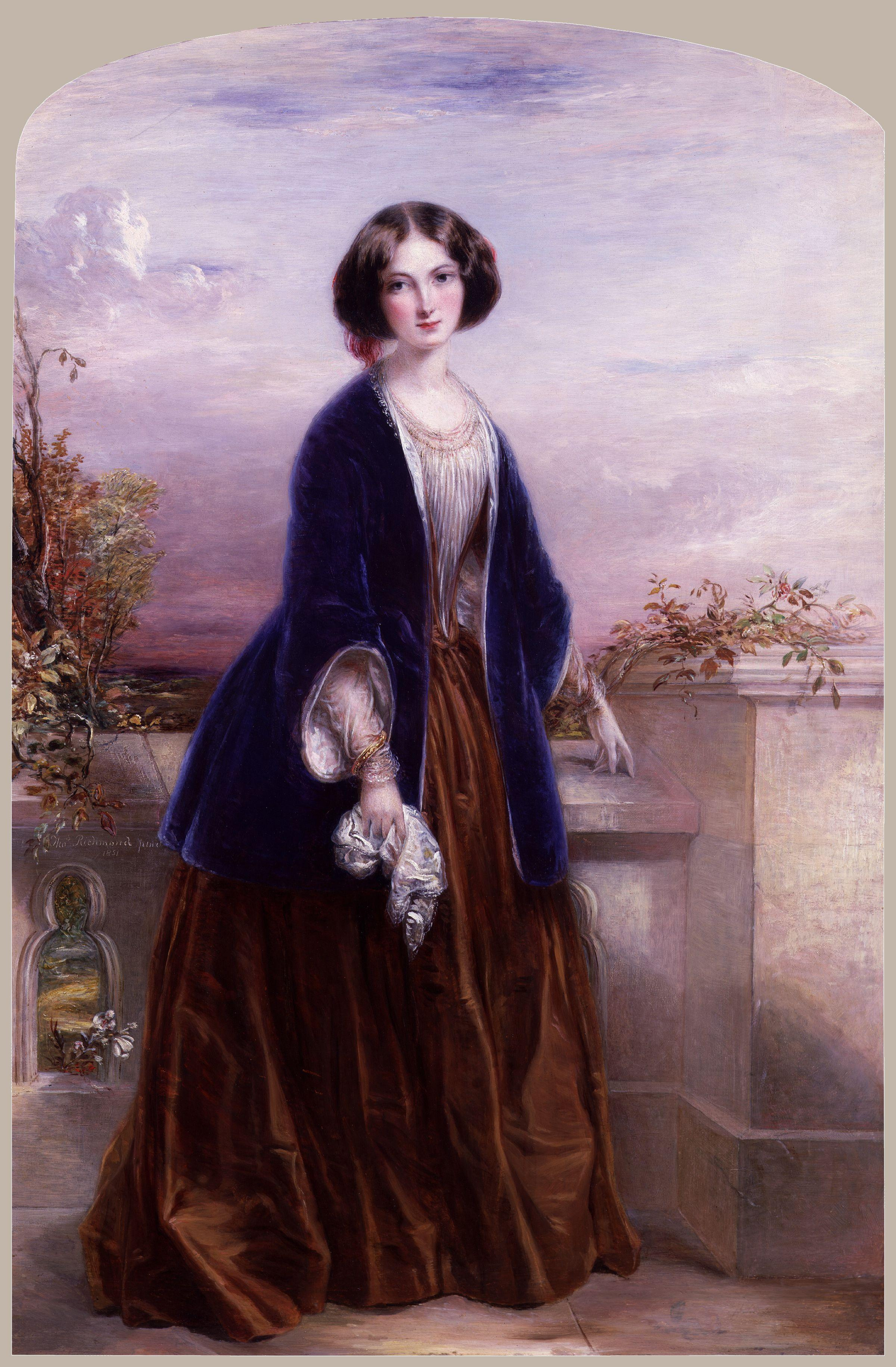
Effie Gray by Thomas Richmond, 1851, oil on board, National Portrait Gallery, London. She thought the portrait made her look like "a graceful doll".

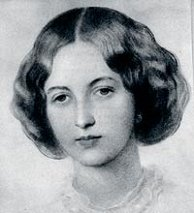
Portrait of Effie Ruskin by George Frederic Watts, 1851

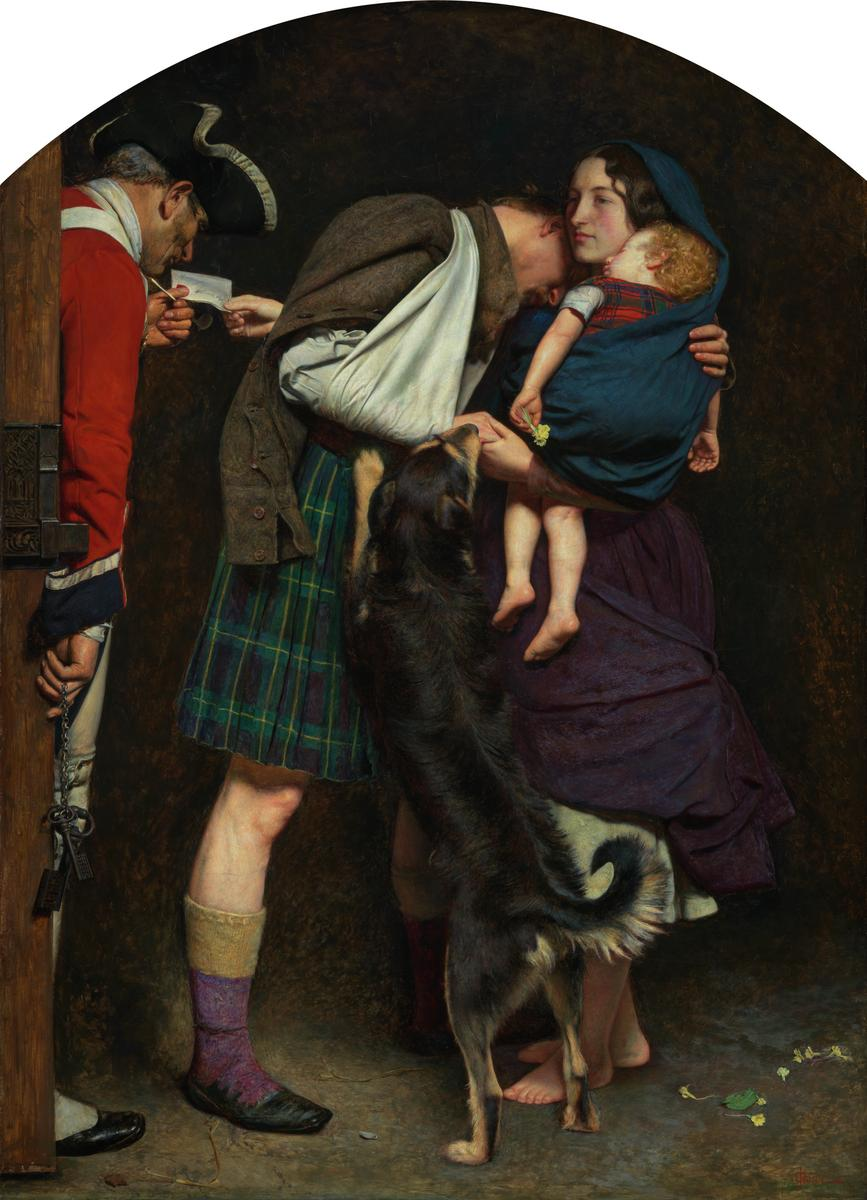
The Order of Release, 1746 by John Everett Millais, 1852–53, oil on canvas, Tate Britain

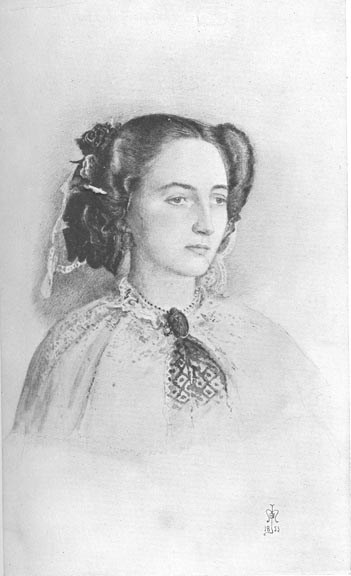
Portrait of Euphemia Chalmers Gray by Millais, 1853, watercolour

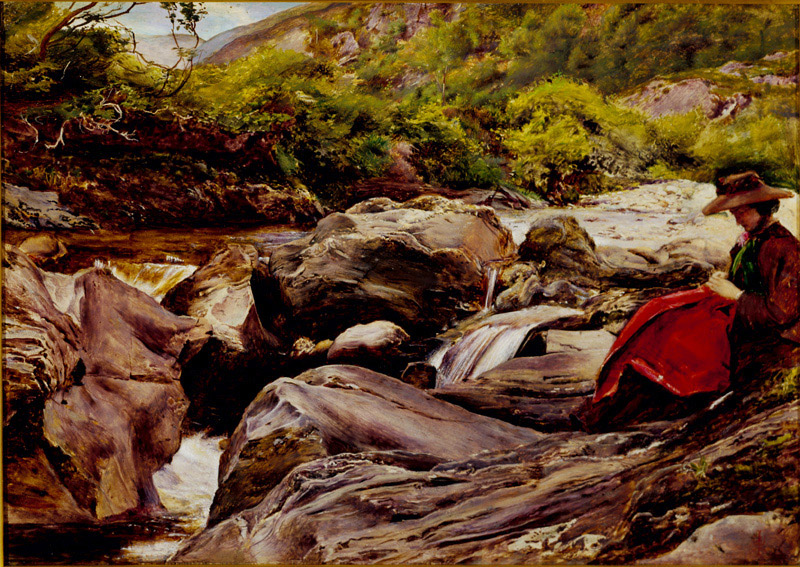
The Waterfall, or Effie at Glenfinlas by Millais, 1853, oil on canvas, Delaware Art Museum

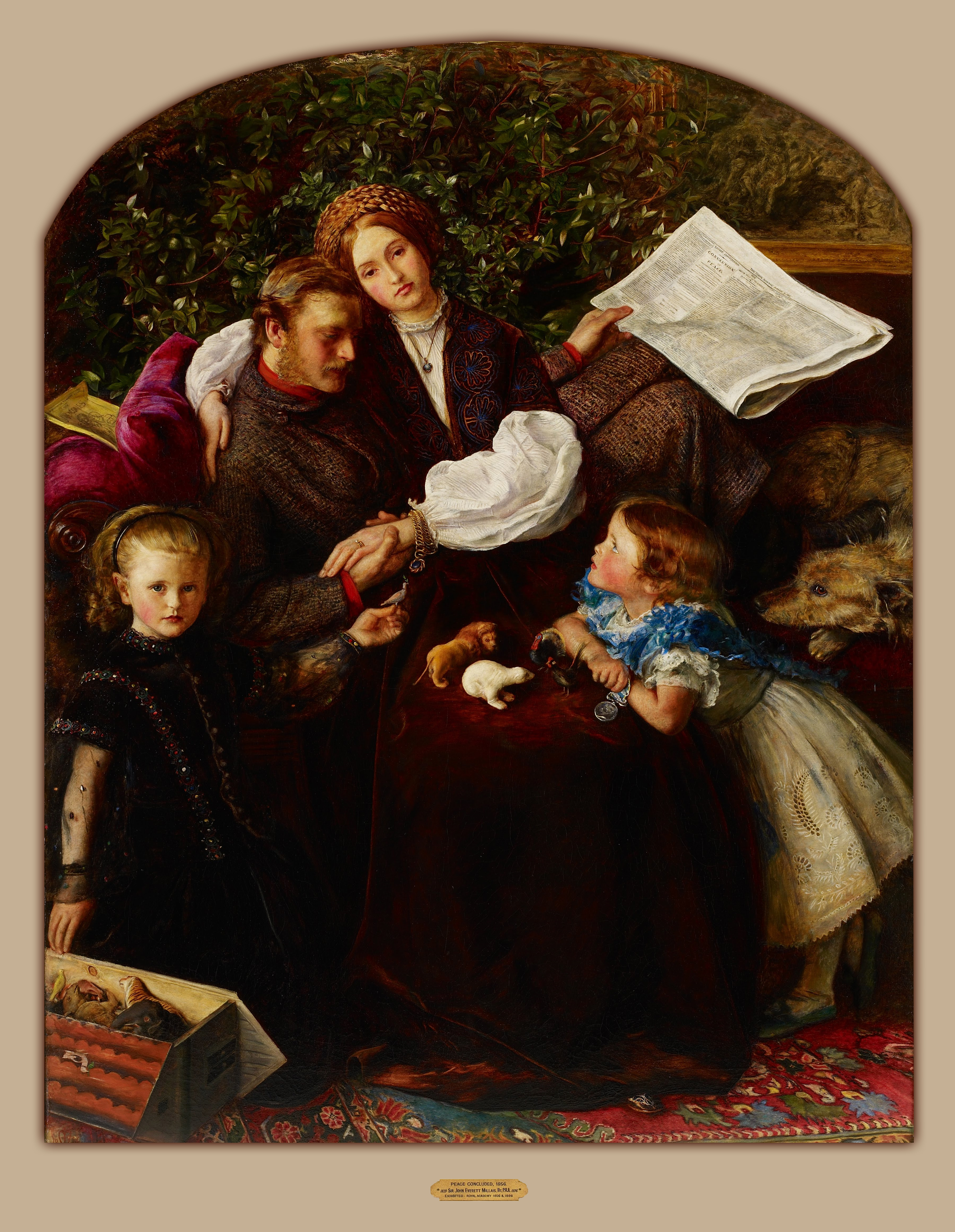
Peace Concluded by Millais, 1856, oil on canvas, Minneapolis Institute of Arts

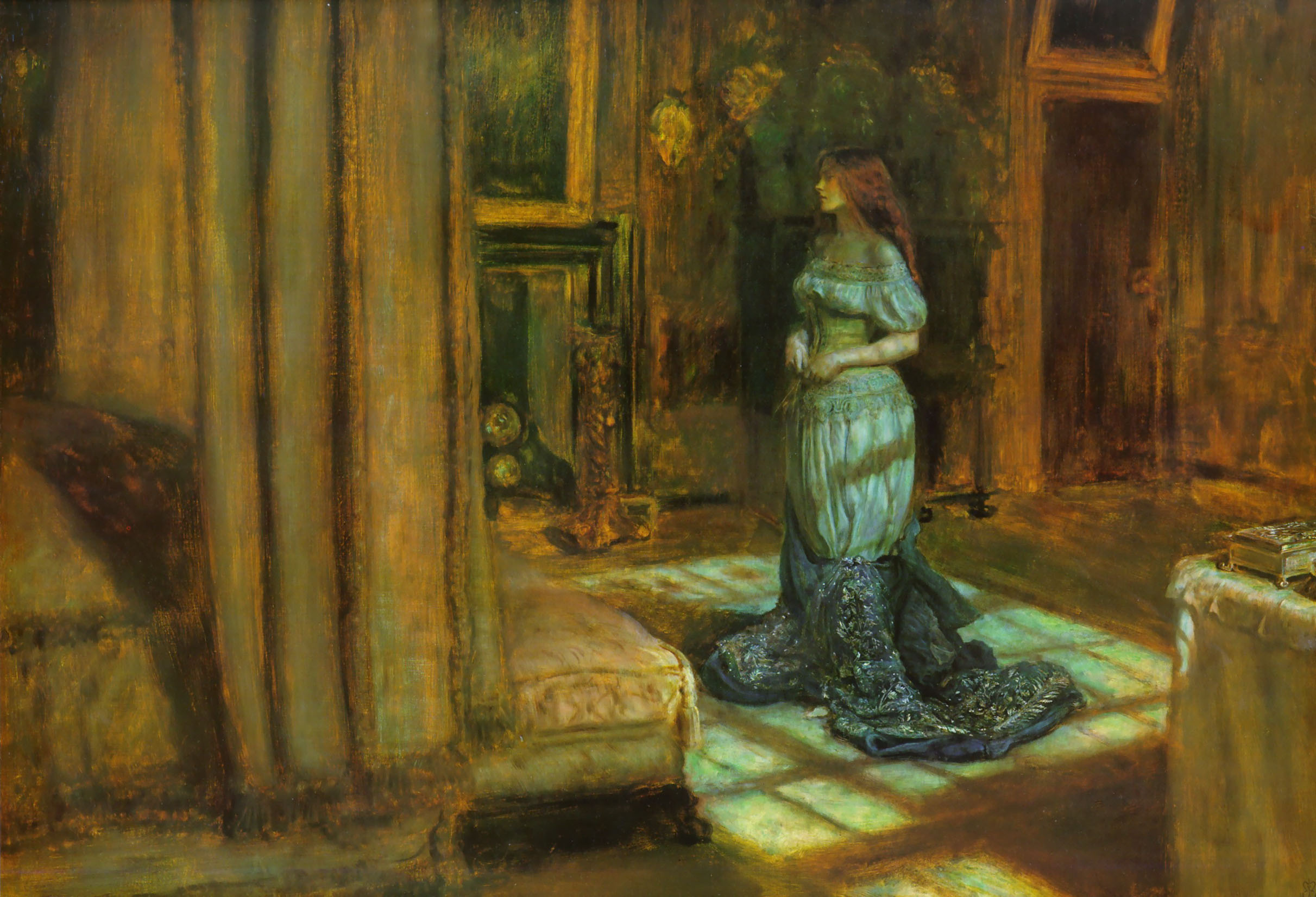
The Eve of St Agnes by Millais, 1863, oil on canvas, Royal Collection

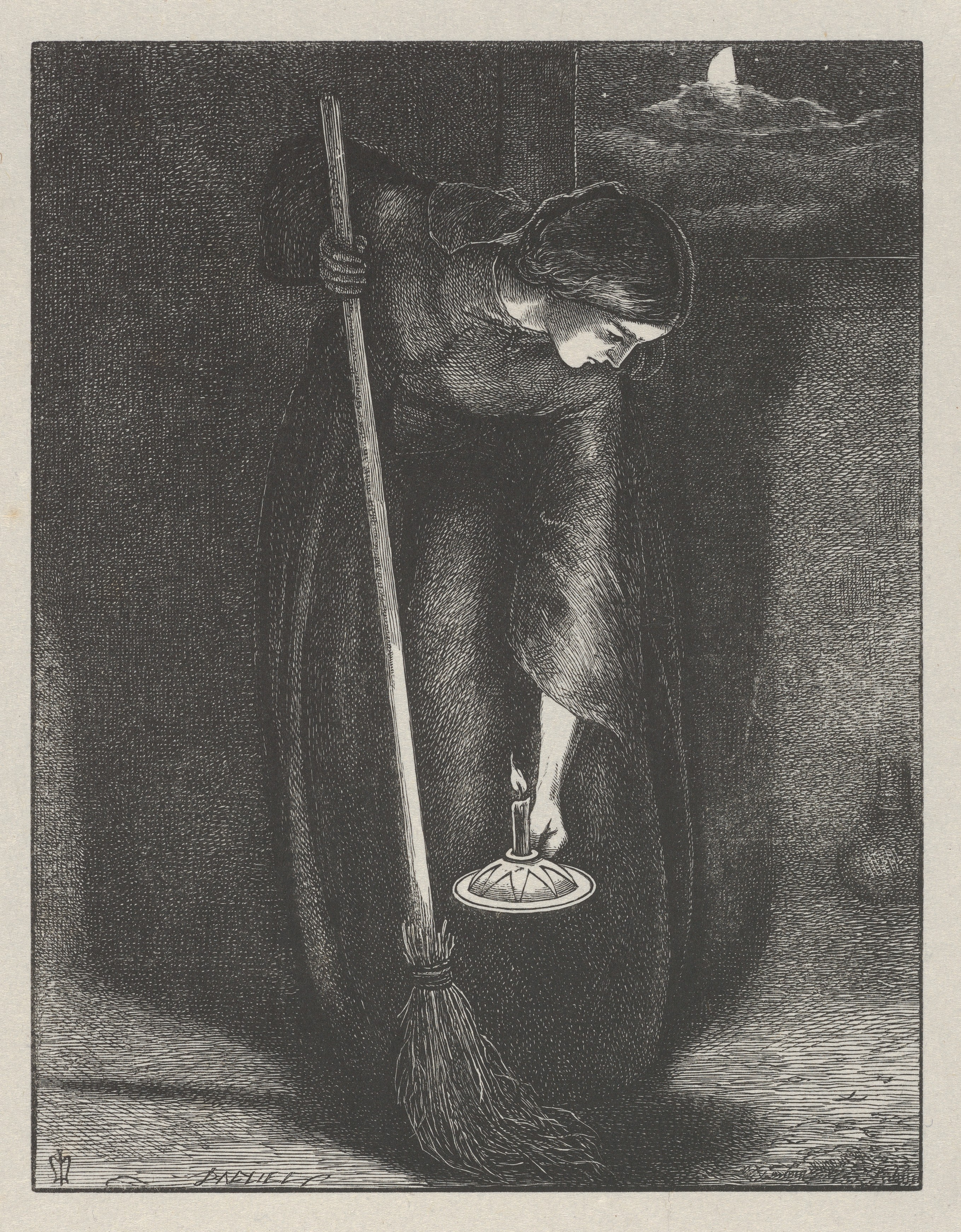
The Lost Piece of Silver by Millais, 1864, wood engraving, Tate Britain

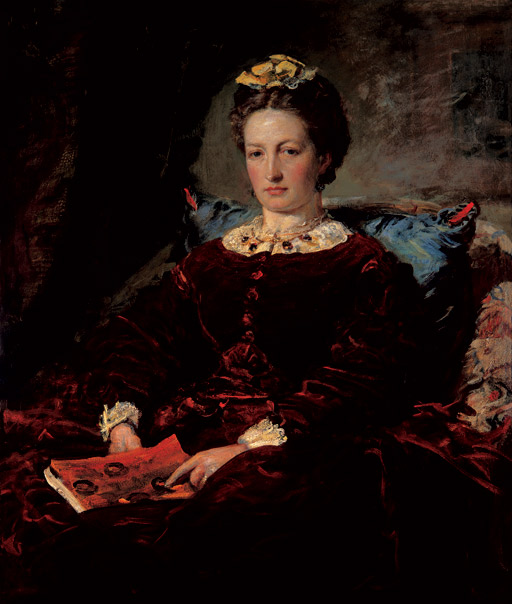
Portrait of Effie Millais by Millais, 1873, oil on canvas, Perth Art Gallery. She is holding a copy of The Cornhill Magazine, to which her husband often contributed illustrations.
