= Rienzi (disambiguation) =

Rienzi may refer to

== Culture ==
- Rienzi (play), the 1828 Tragedy in Five Acts by Mary Mitford.
- Rienzi, the Last of the Roman Tribunes, the 1835 novel by Edward Bulwer-Lytton
- Rienzi, an opera by Richard Wagner based on the above
- Rienzi (Hunt painting), full title Rienzi vowing to obtain justice for the death of his young brother, slain in a skirmish between the Colonna and the Orsini factions, a painting by English artist William Holman Hunt

== People ==
- Cola di Rienzo, an Italian medieval politician and popular leader
- Adrian Cola Rienzi (1905-1972), a Trinidad and Tobago lawyer, politician and labour leader

== Other ==
- Rienzi, Mississippi, a town in the United States
- The horse of American Civil War general Philip Sheridan, named after a battle in the above town
