= Royal Academy Exhibition of 1849 =

1849 art exhibition in London

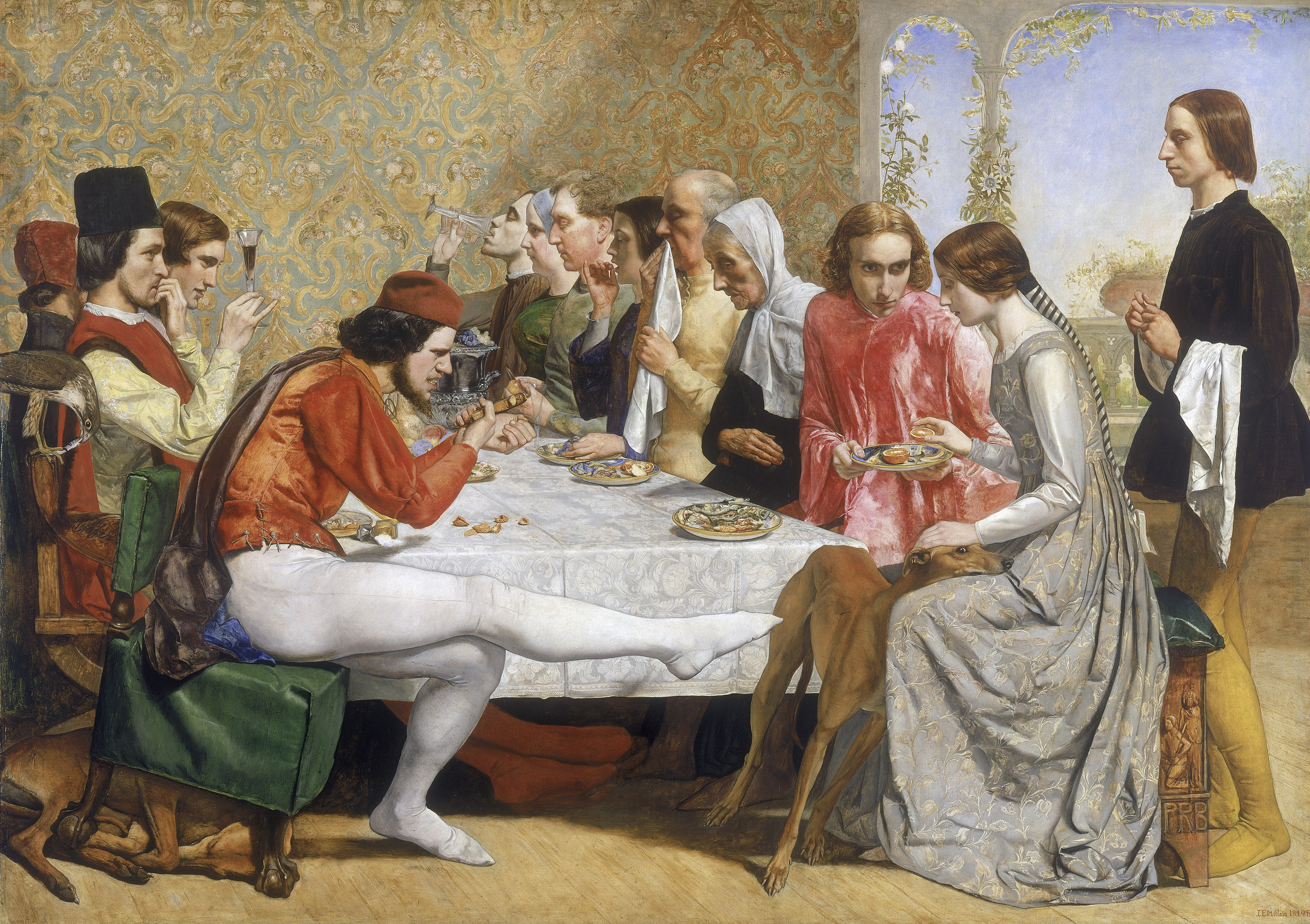
Isabella by John Everett Millais

The Royal Academy Exhibition of 1849 was the eighty first edition of the annual Summer Exhibition staged by the British Royal Academy of Arts. It took place at the National Gallery in London from 7 May to 28 July 1849, featuring submissions from prominent artists, sculptors and architects of the early Victorian era. It was noted for the emergence of the Pre-Raphaelite Brotherhood.

While John Everett Millais had first displayed a work at the Academy in 1846, this was his debut painting in the Pre-Raphaelite style with Isabella, a scene inspired by the poem of the same title by John Keats. William Holman Hunt's Rienzi was drawn from the novel of the same title by Edward Bulwer-Lytton. Another member of the Brotherhood James Collinson's Italian Image Makers at a Roadside Alehouse attracted much less attention. These were not the first ever exhibitions of Pre-Raphaelite paintings, as Dante Gabriel Rossetti had already submitted The Girlhood of Mary Virgin to the Free Exhibition of Modern Art at Hyde Park Corner which opened in March. Rossetti had originally planned to send the work to the Royal Academy but chose the smaller, juryless Free Exhibition instead.

It was the penultimate appearance of the veteran J.M.W. Turner who had been exhibiting at the Royal Academy for many decades. He submitted a single work The Wreck Buoy, a reworking of a much earlier painting that he had added significant amounts of colour to enhance its brightness. In addition the owner of another one of Turner's earlier paintings Venus and Adonis exhibited that as well.

In portraiture Henry Wyndham Phillips painted the exiled Austrian statesman Metternich which resembled the much earlier Klemens von Metternich by Thomas Lawrence. Henry William Pickersgill featured several works including portraits of the architects Charles Barry and Thomas Cubitt. The Portrait of James McNeill Whistler by William Boxall depicted the future artist at the age of fourteen.

== Gallery ==
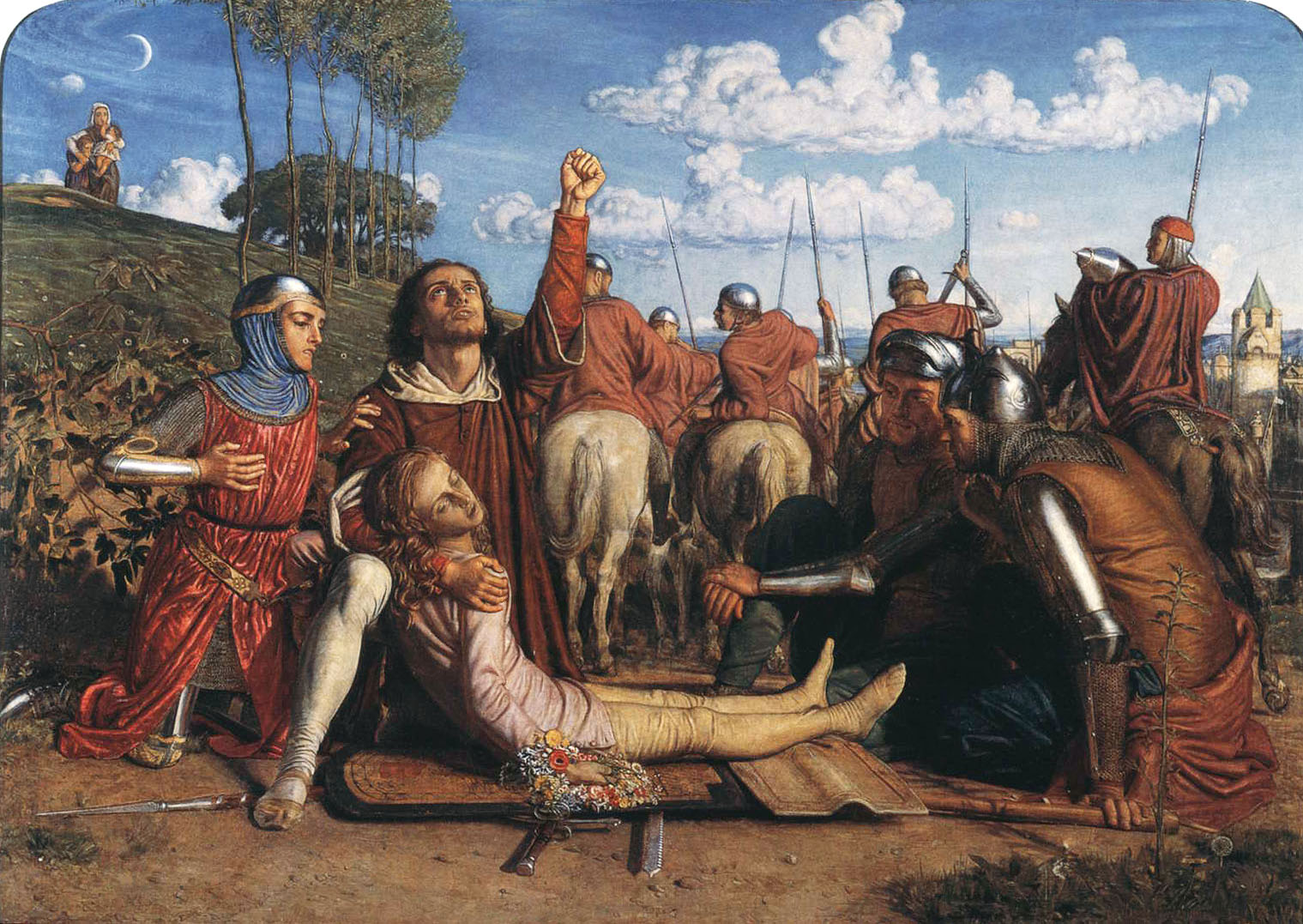
Rienzi by William Holman Hunt

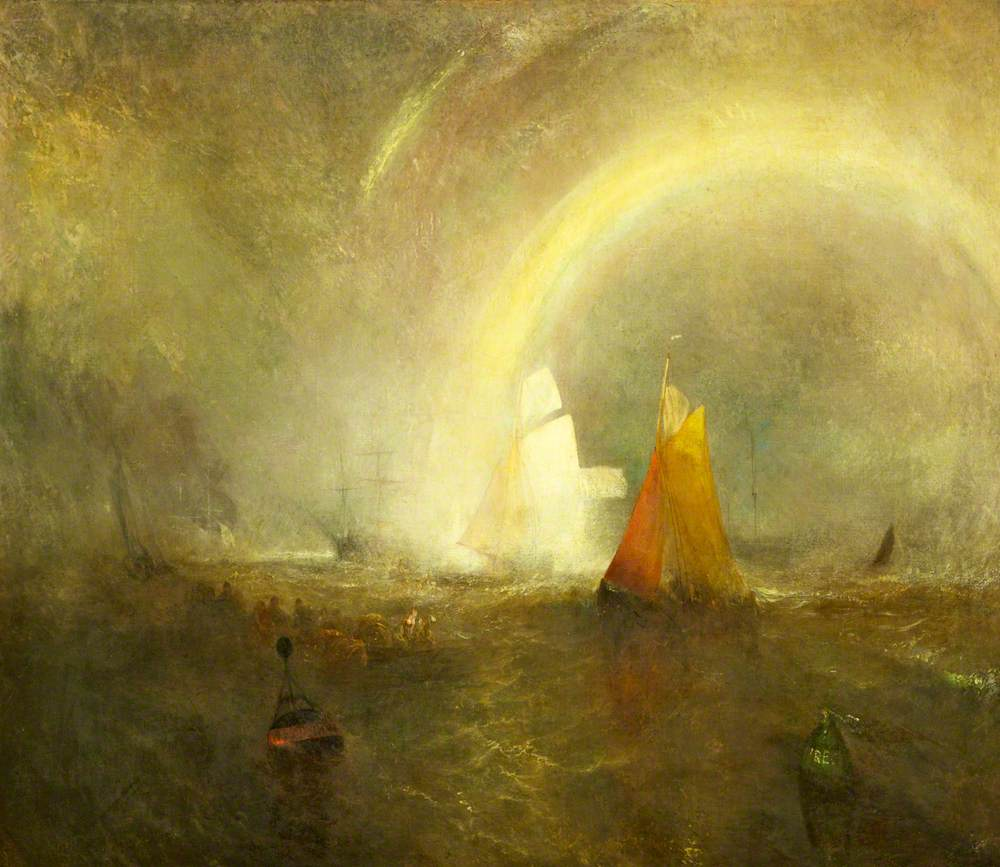
The Wreck Buoy by J.M.W. Turner

Italian Image Makers at a Roadside Alehouse by James Collinson

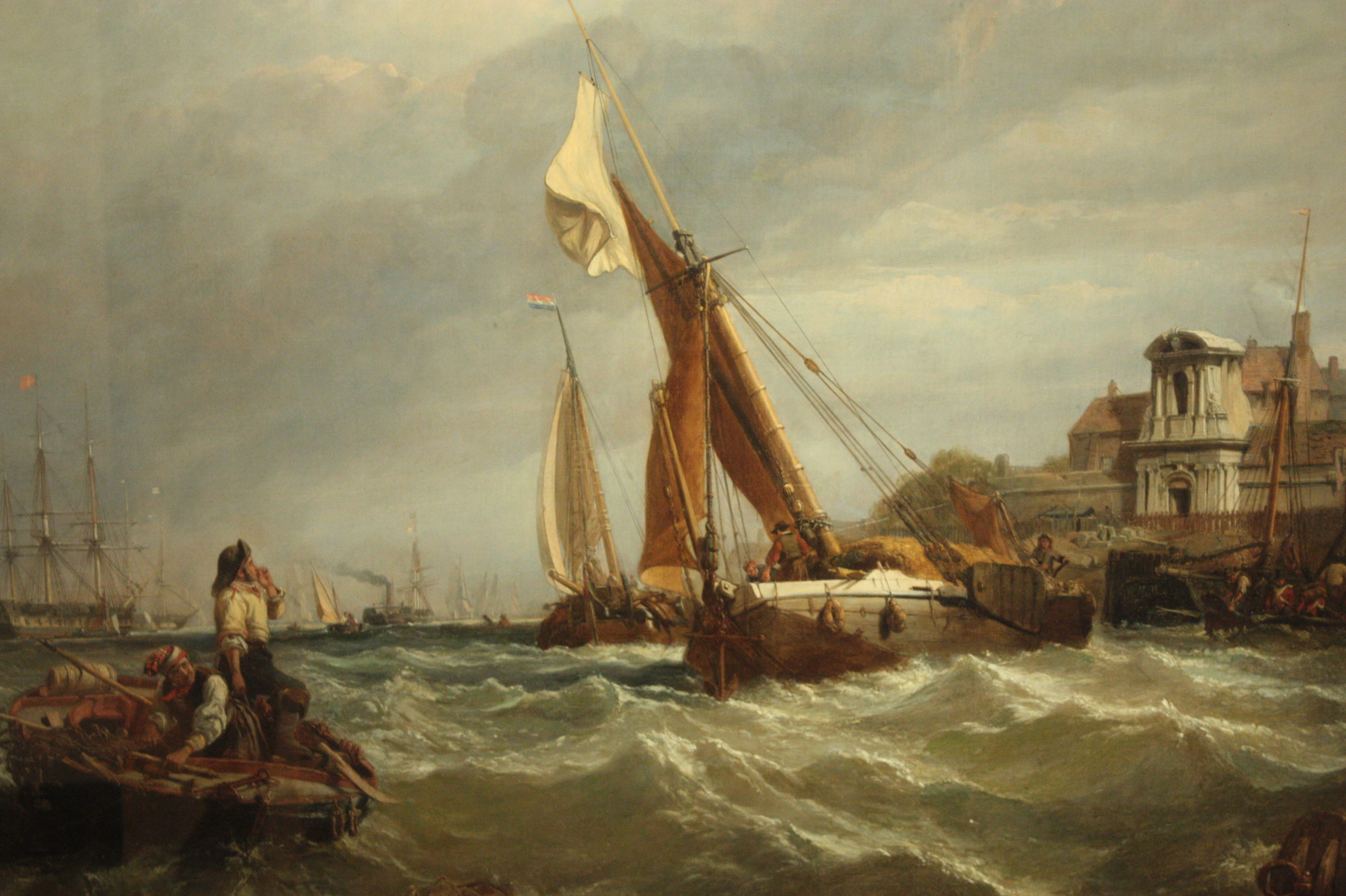
Tilbury Fort - Wind Against Tide by Clarkson Stanfield

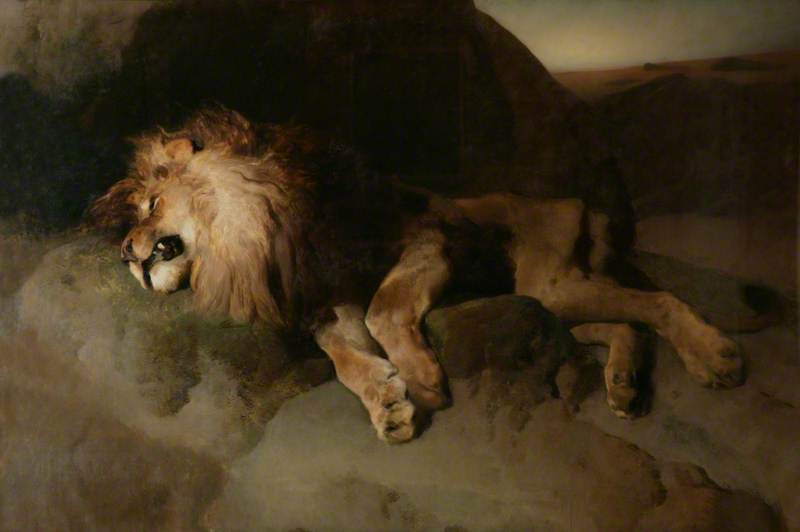
The Desert by Edwin Landseer

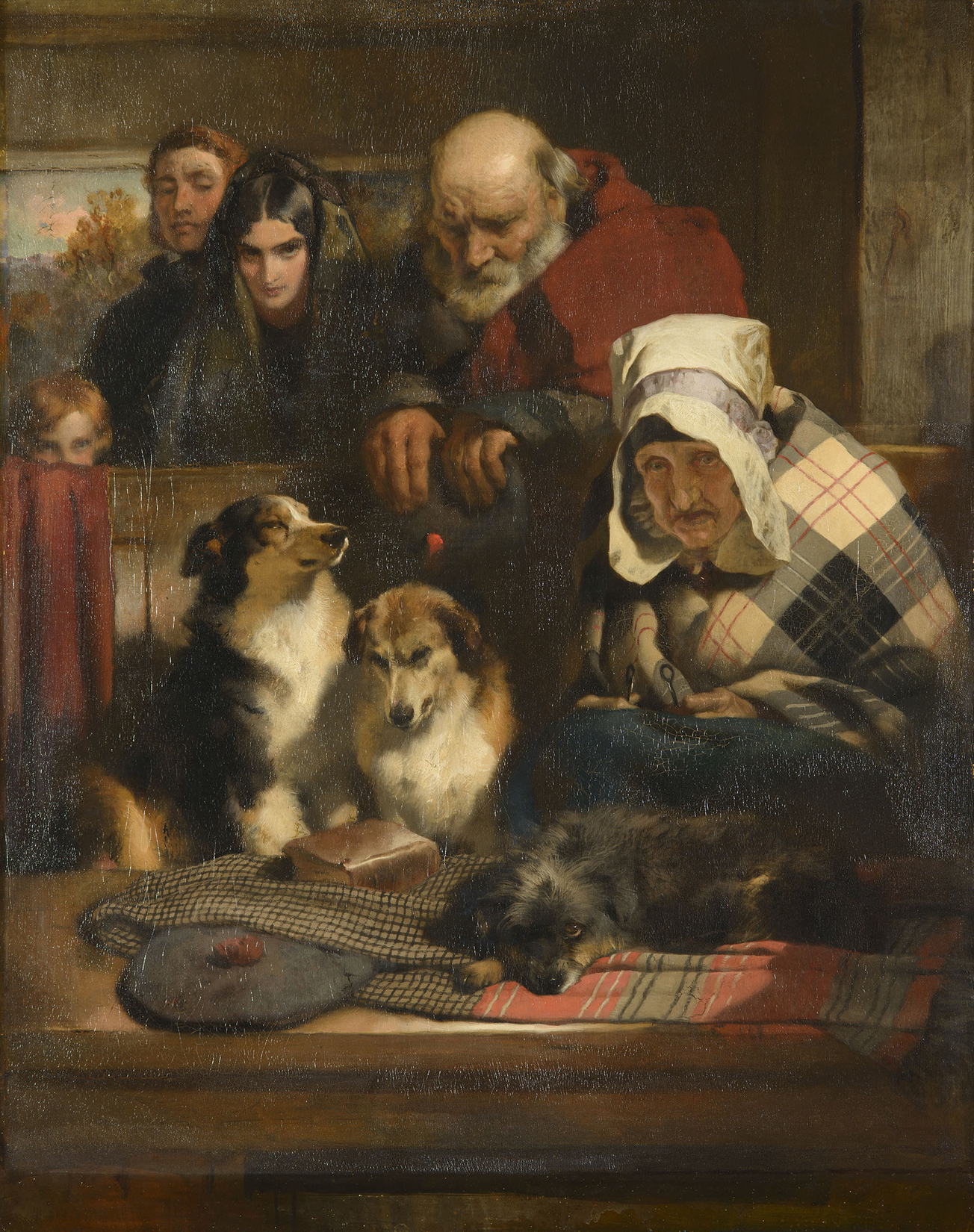
The Free Kirk by Edwin Landseer

The Forester's Family by Edwin Landseer

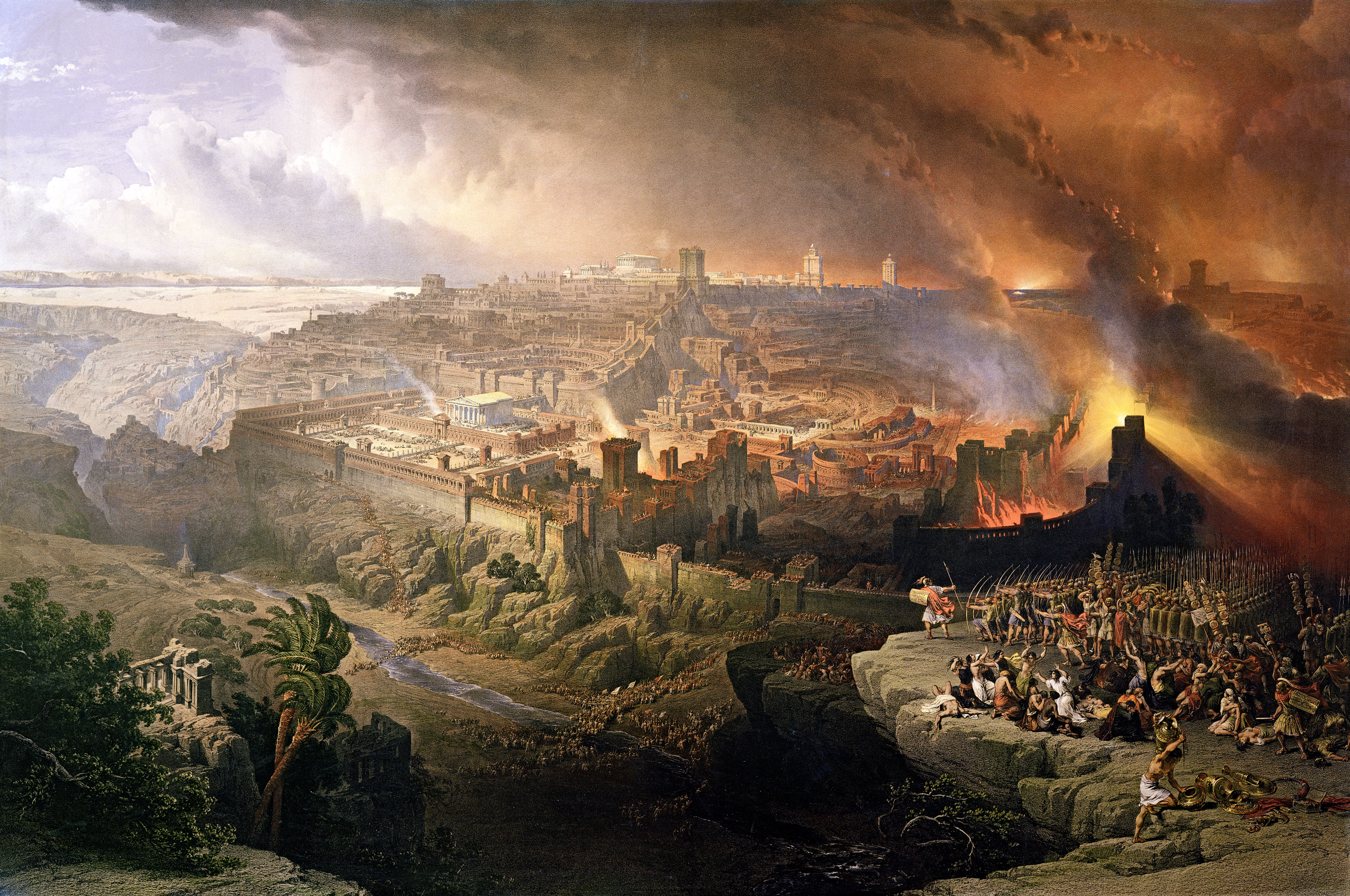
The Siege and Destruction of Jerusalem by David Roberts

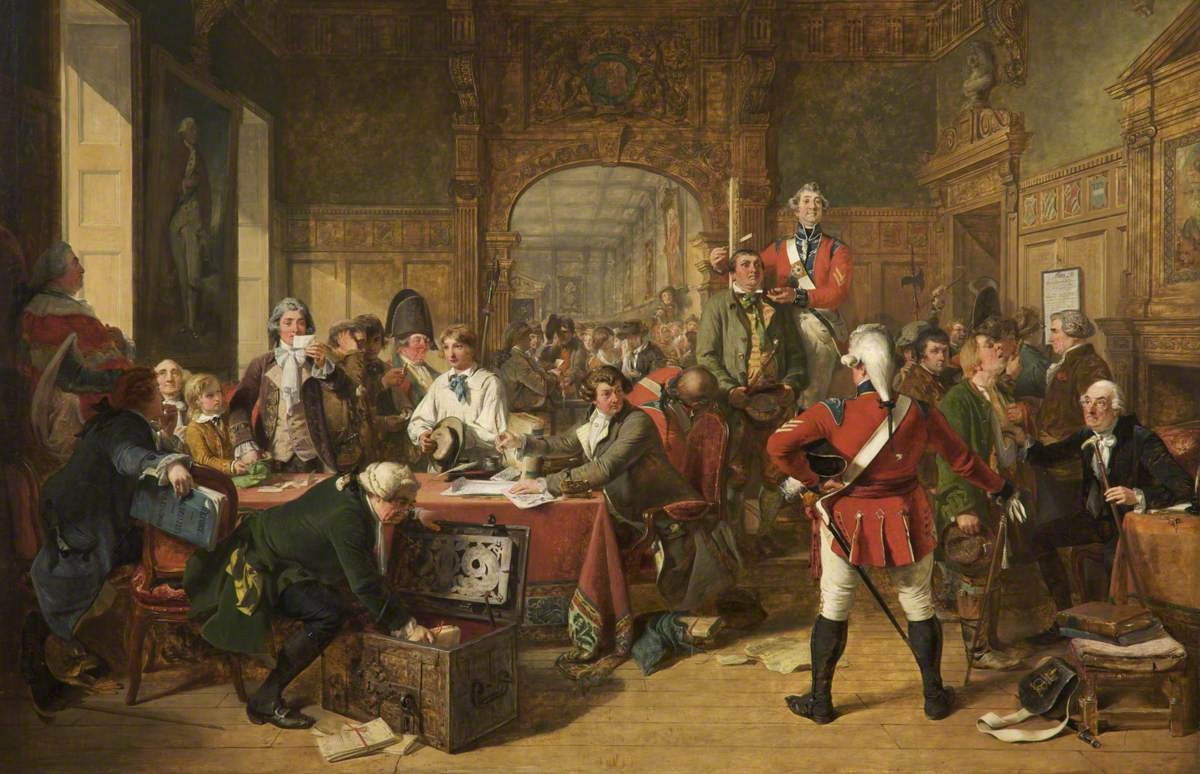
Drawing for the Militia by John Phillip

Coming of Age by William Powell Frith

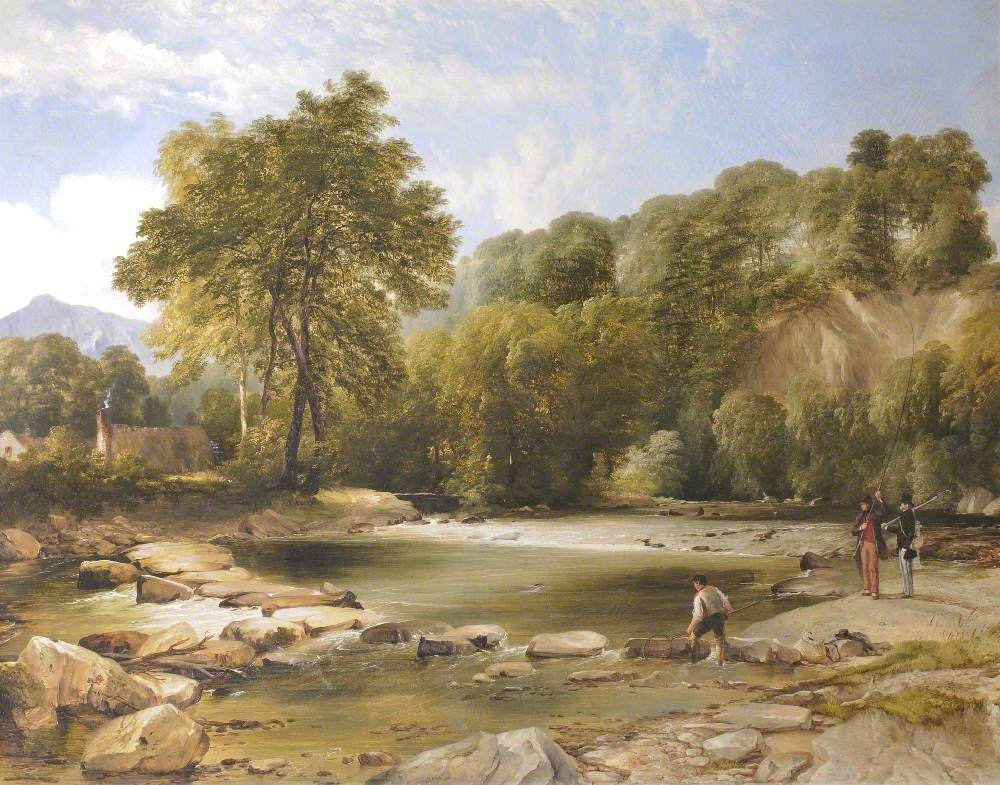
Landing a Salmon by Frederick Richard Lee

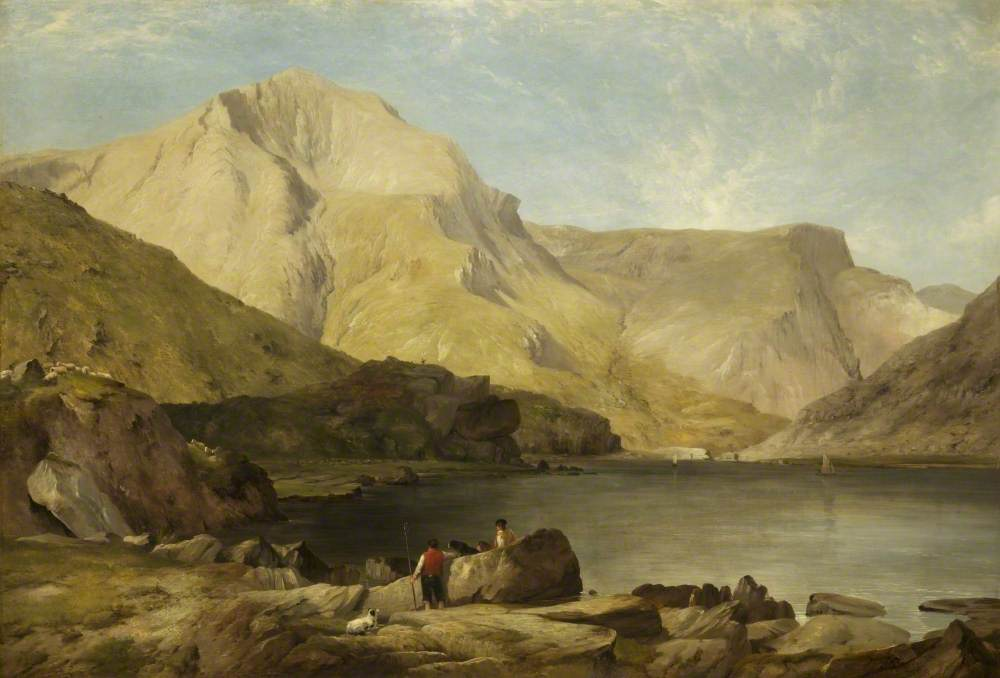
The Ogwen Lake by Frederick Richard Lee

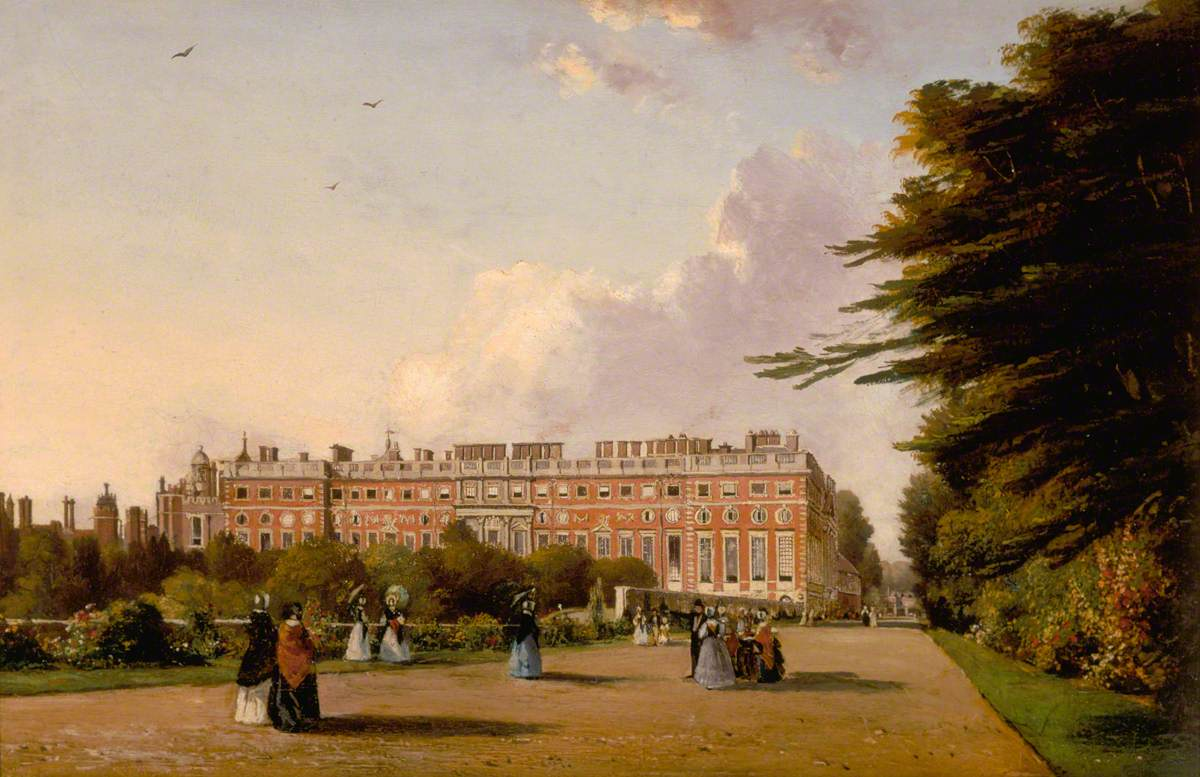
Hampton Court by George Hilditch

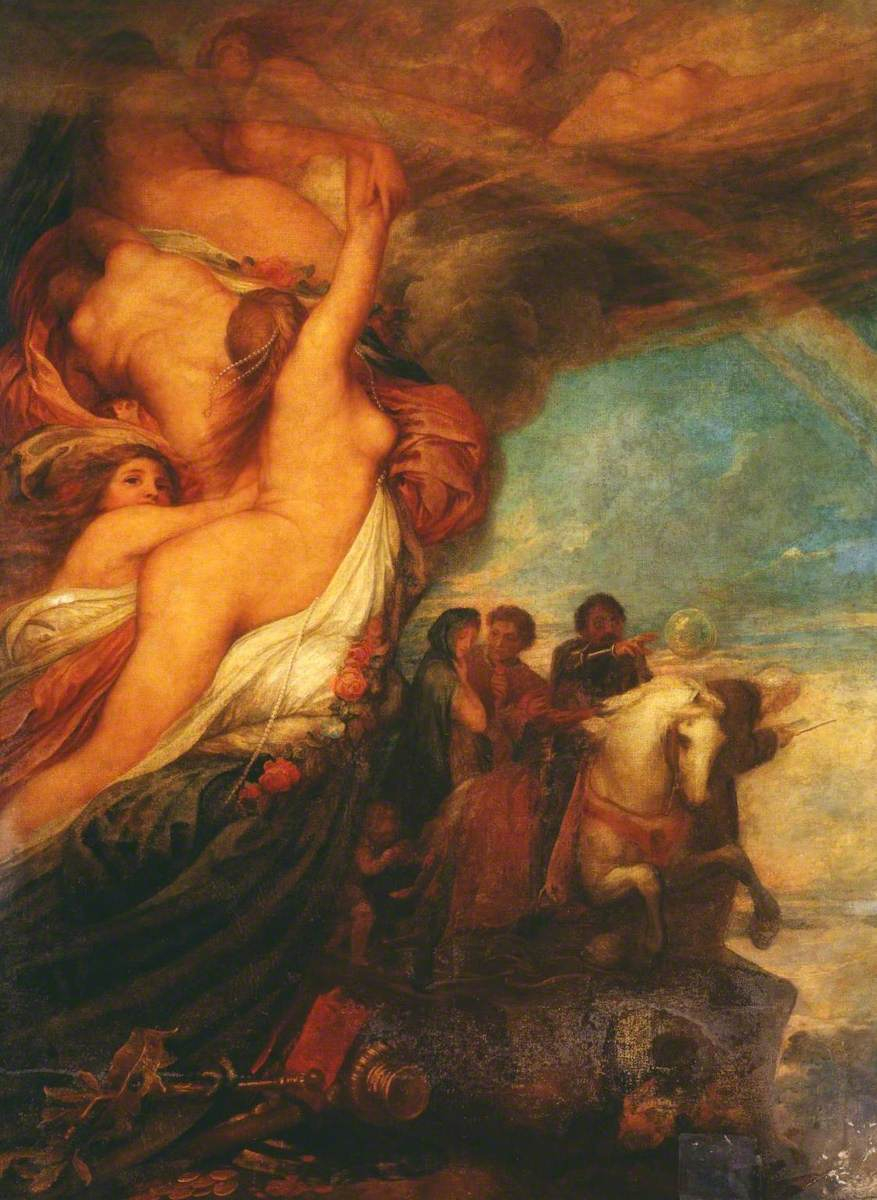
Life's Illusions by George Frederic Watts

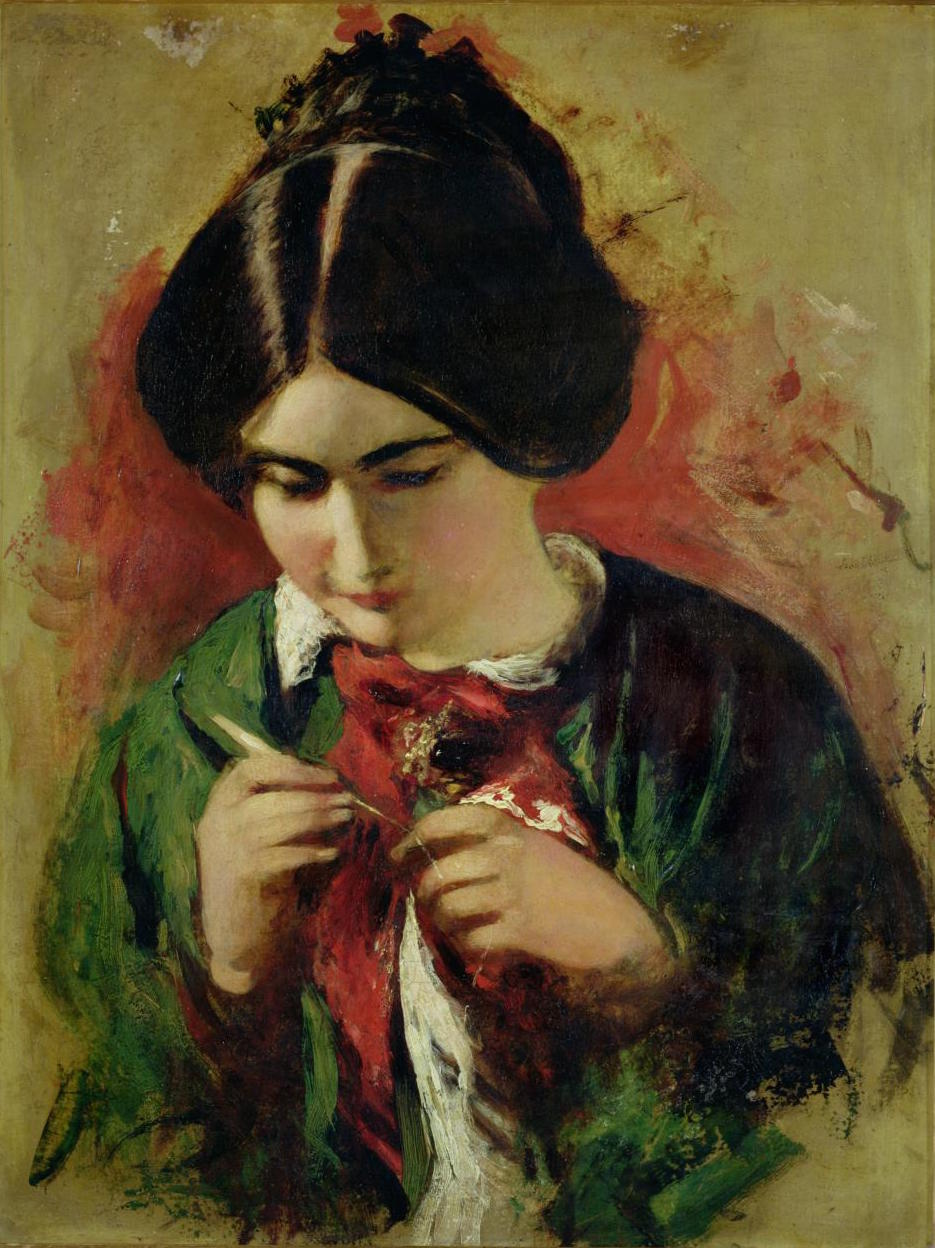
The Crochet Worker by William Etty

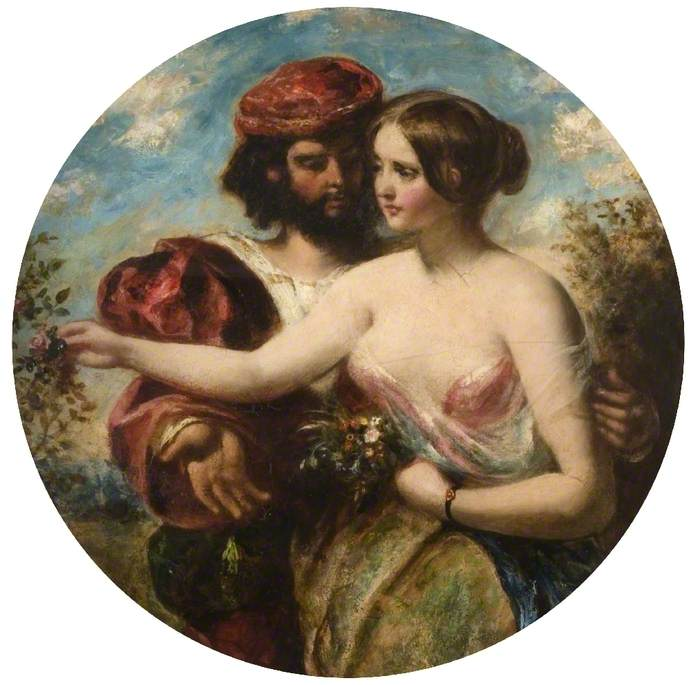
Gather the Rose of Love by William Etty

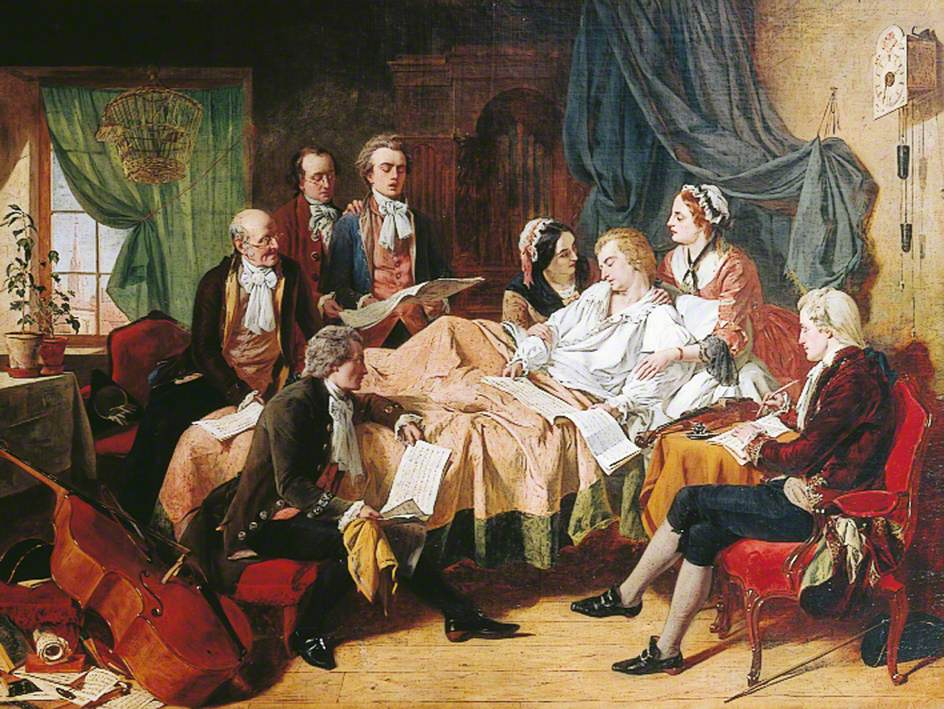
The Last Hours of Mozart by Henry Nelson O'Neil

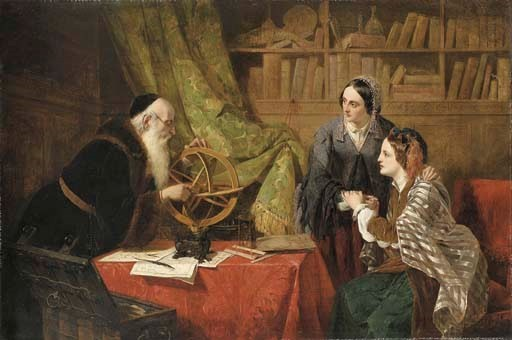
Consulting the Astrologer by Henry Nelson O'Neil

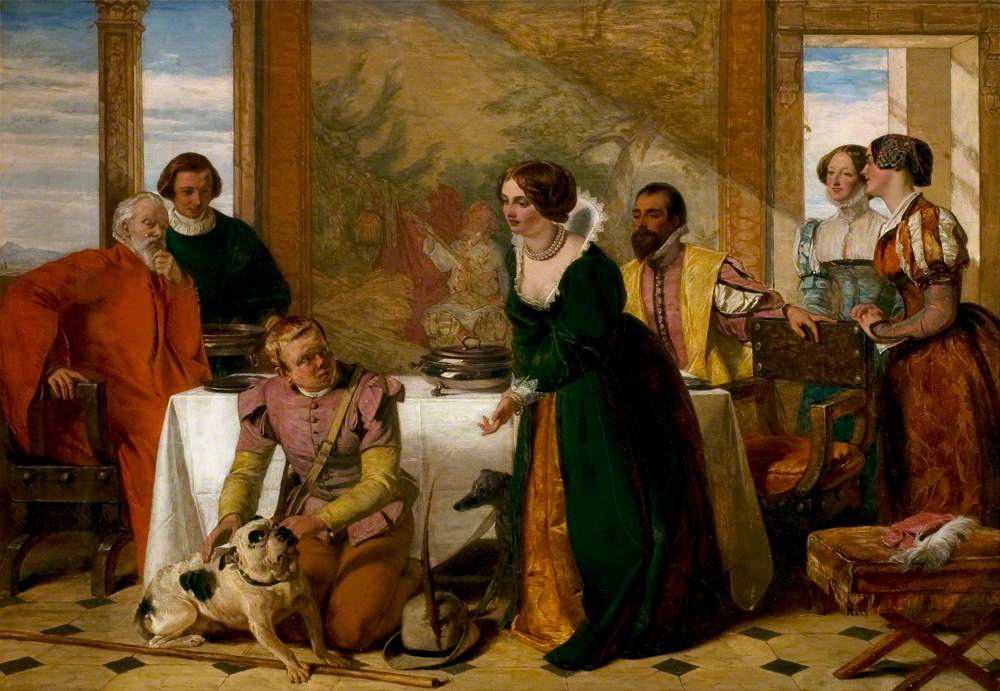
Launce's Substitute for Proteus' Dog by Augustus Egg

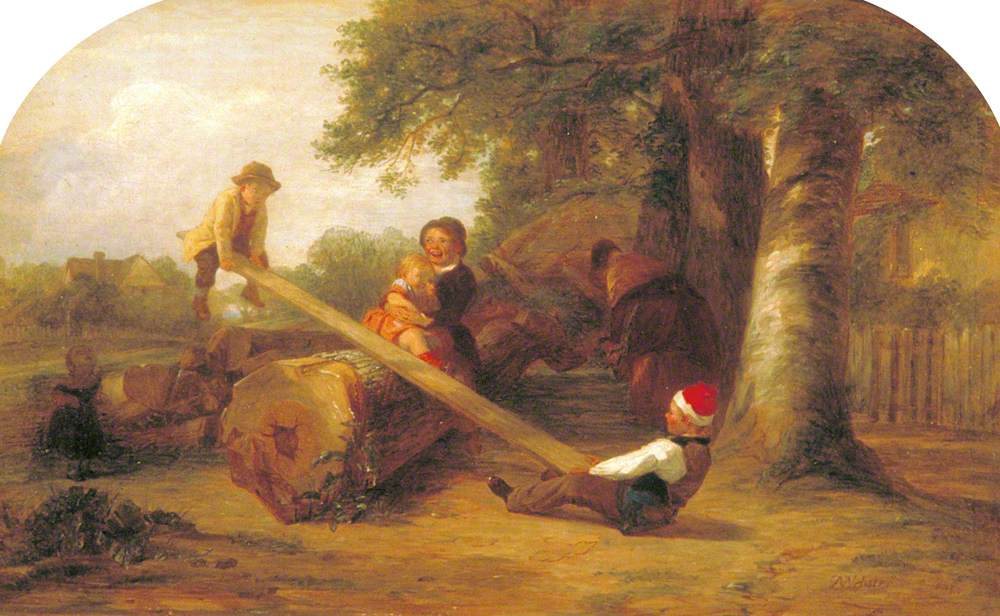
The See-Saw by Thomas Webster

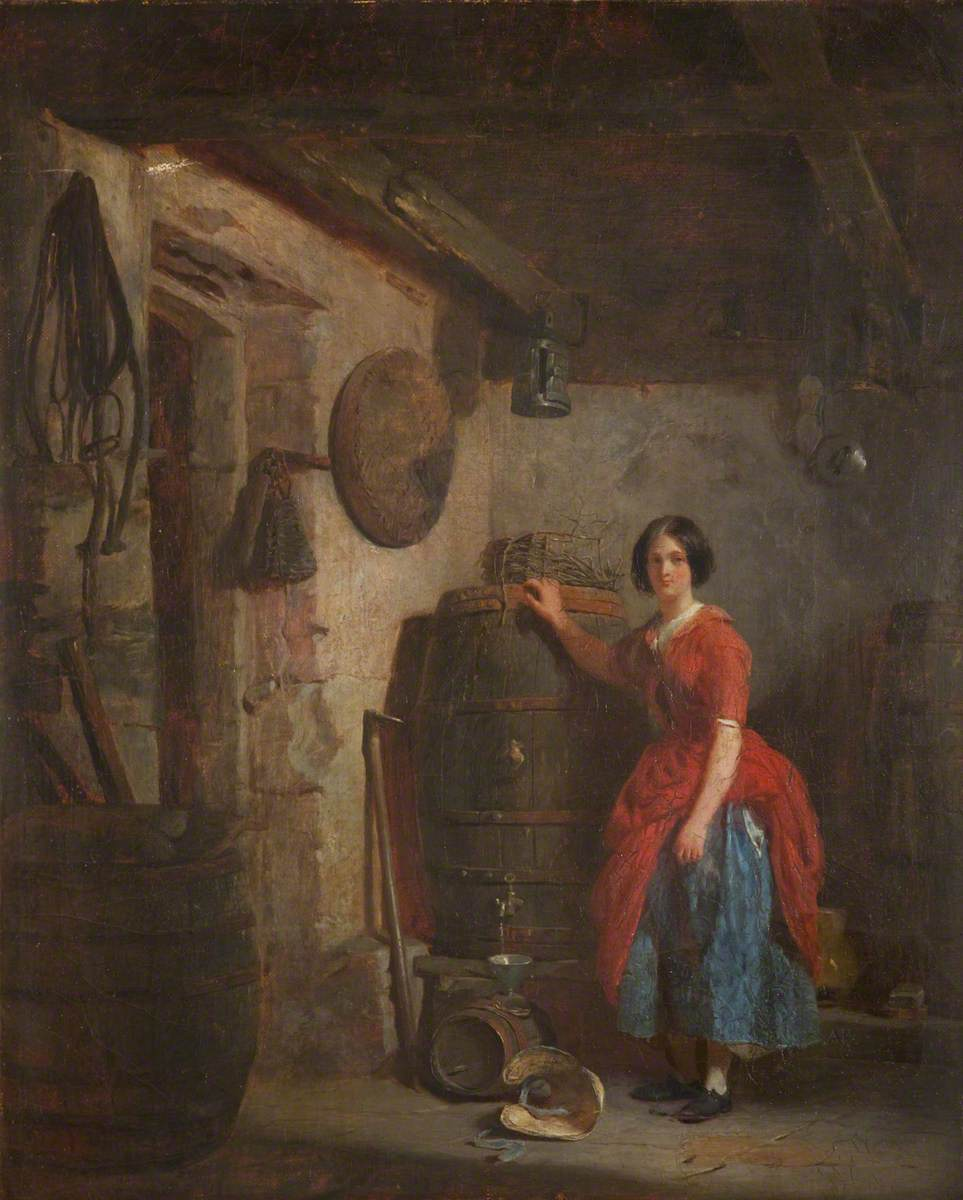
Harvest Ale by Alfred Provis

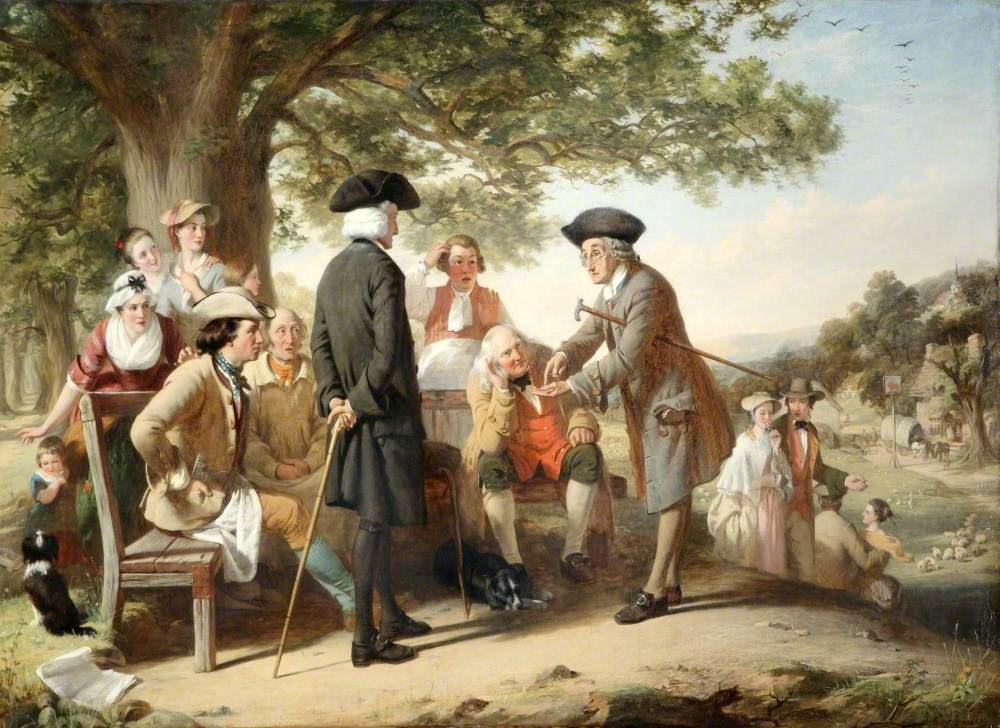
The Village Schoolmaster by Thomas Brooks

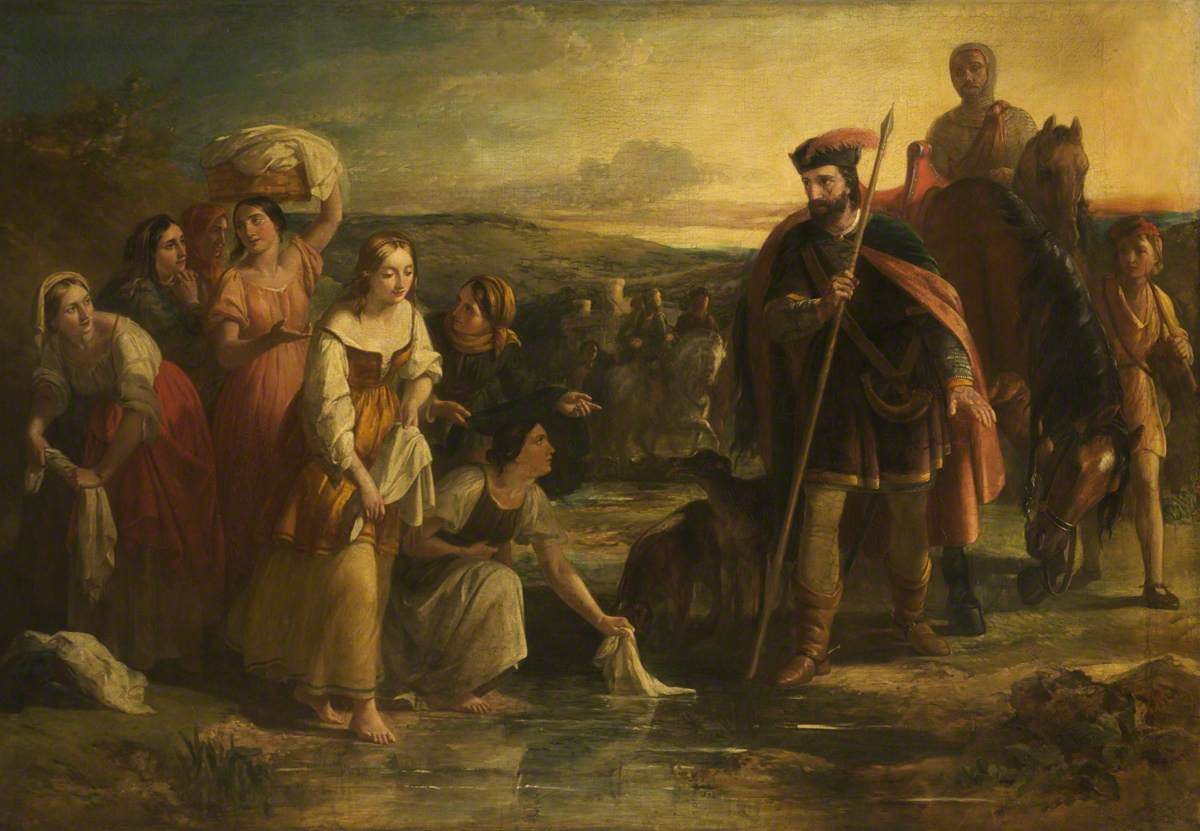
The Meeting of Robert of Normandy and Arlotta by Henry Hall Pickersgill

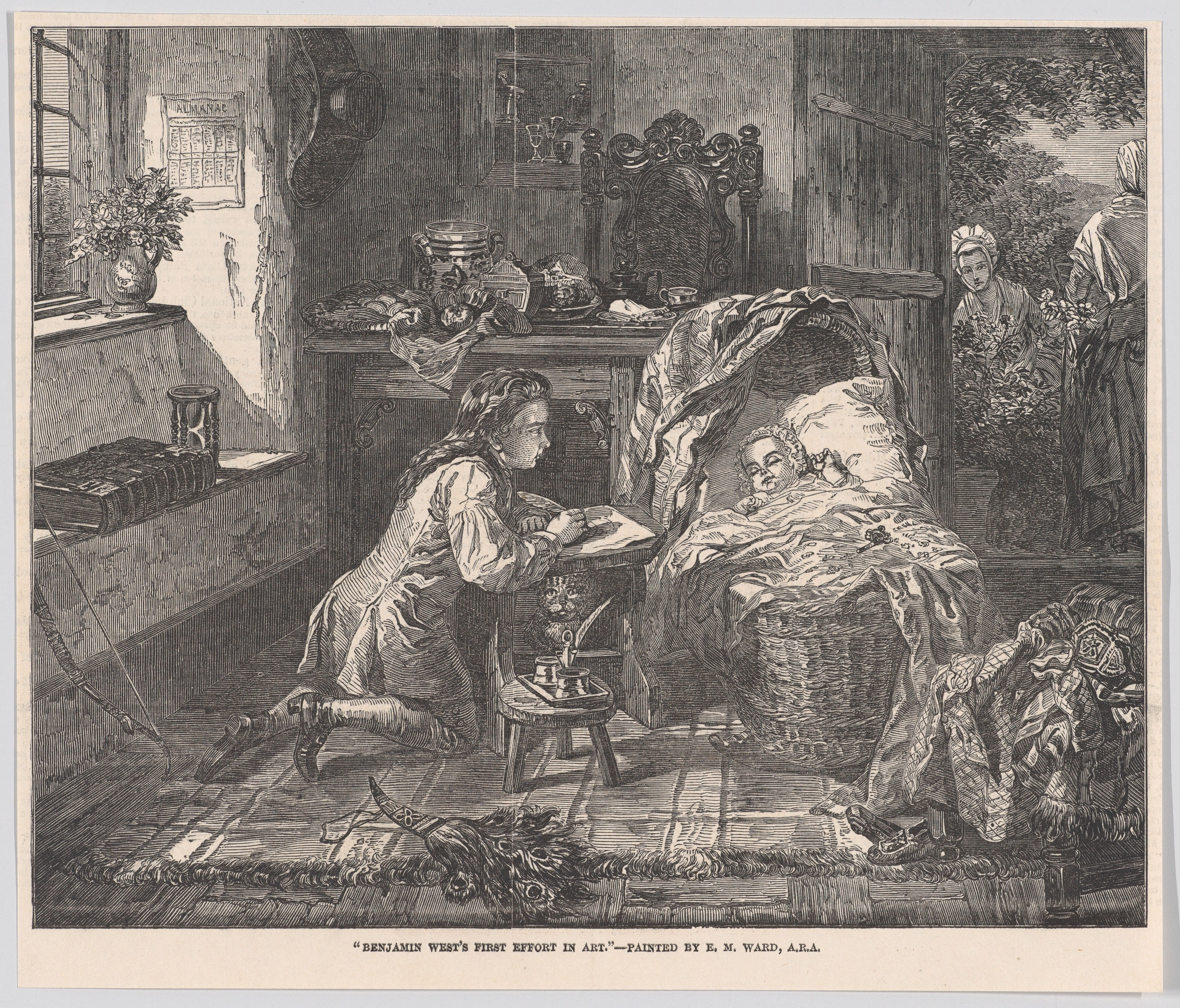
Benjamin West's First Effort in Art, engraving based on painting by Edward Matthew Ward

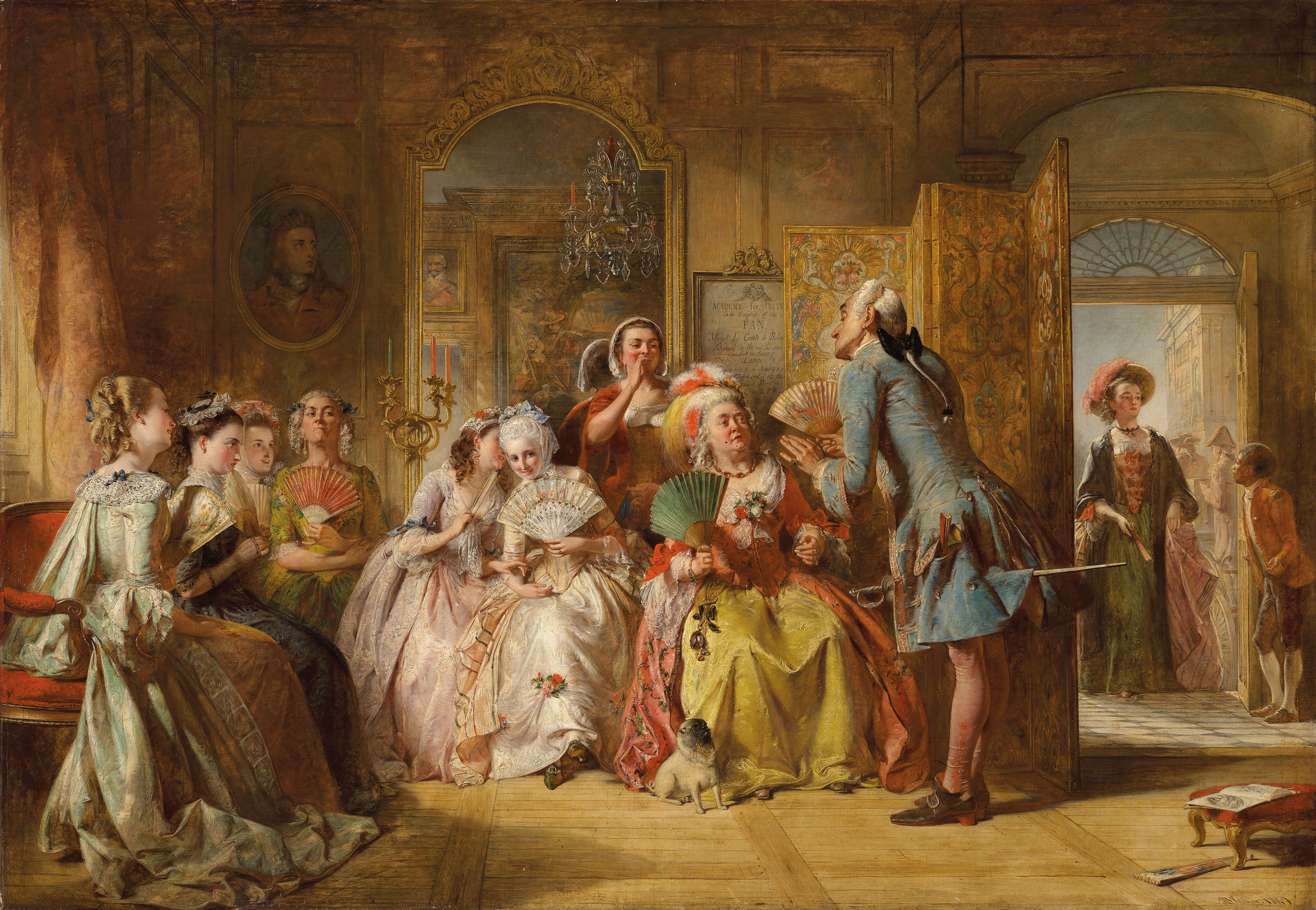
Academy for Instruction in the Discipline of the Fan, 1711 by Abraham Solomon

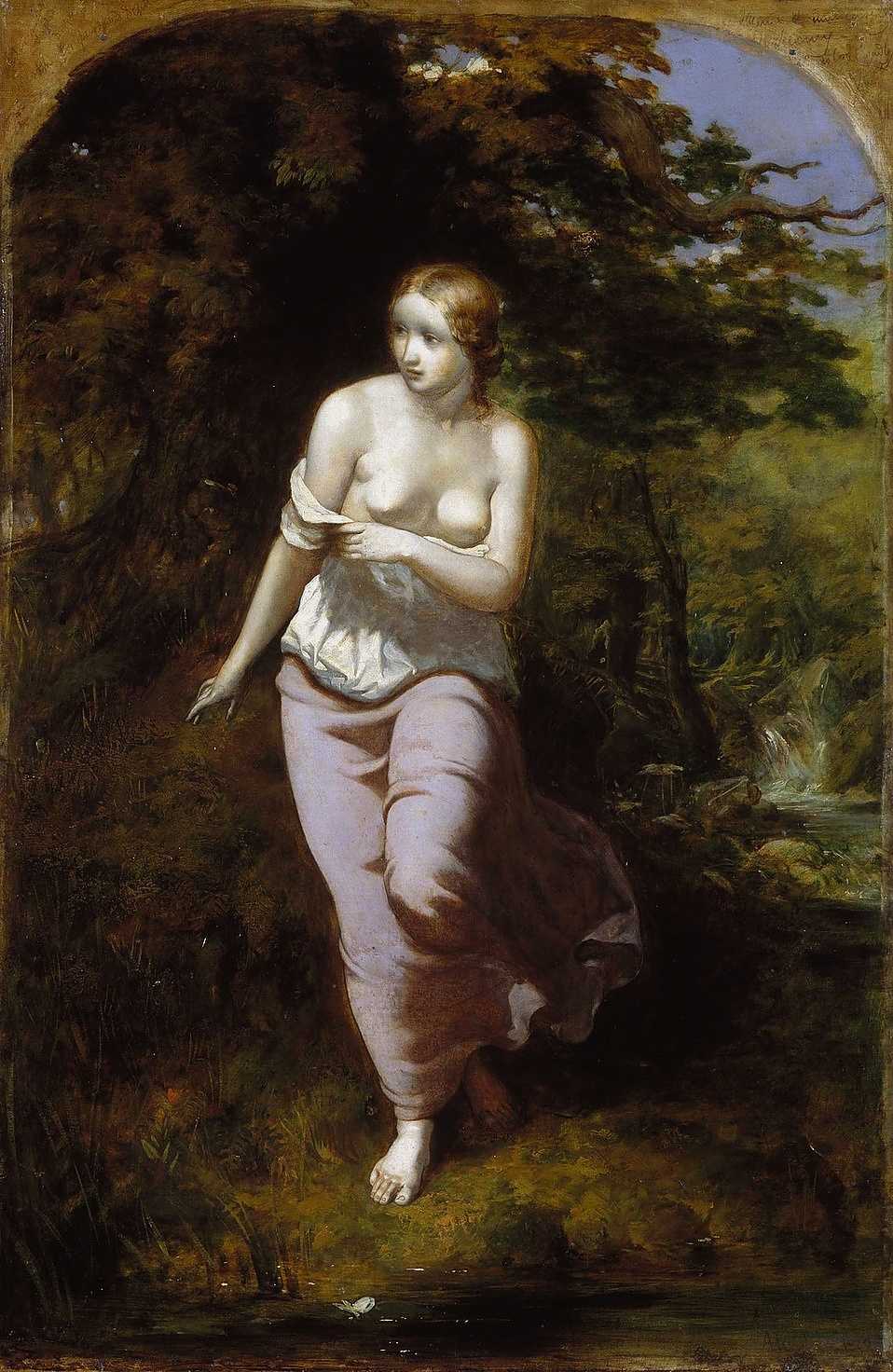
Musidora Bathing by Arthur Hughes

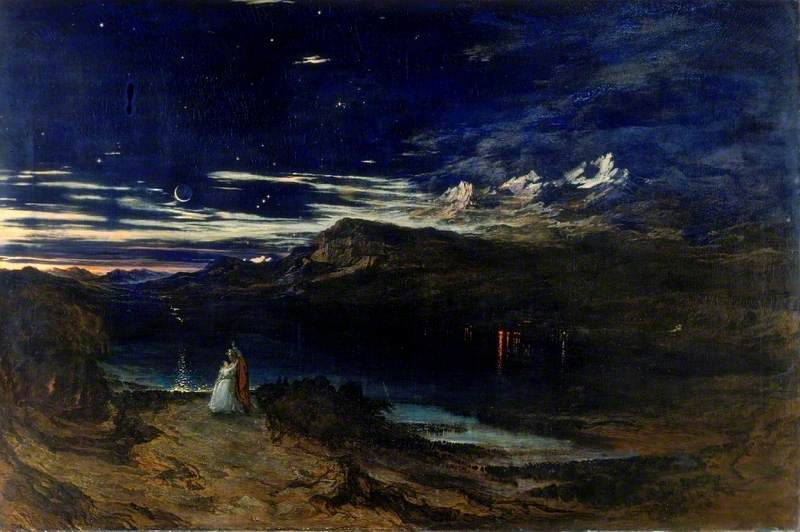
Arthur and Aegle in the Happy Valley by John Martin

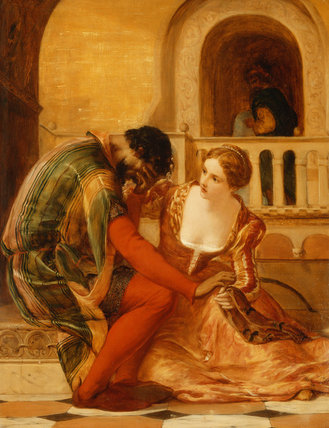
Othello's First Suspicion by James Clarke Hook

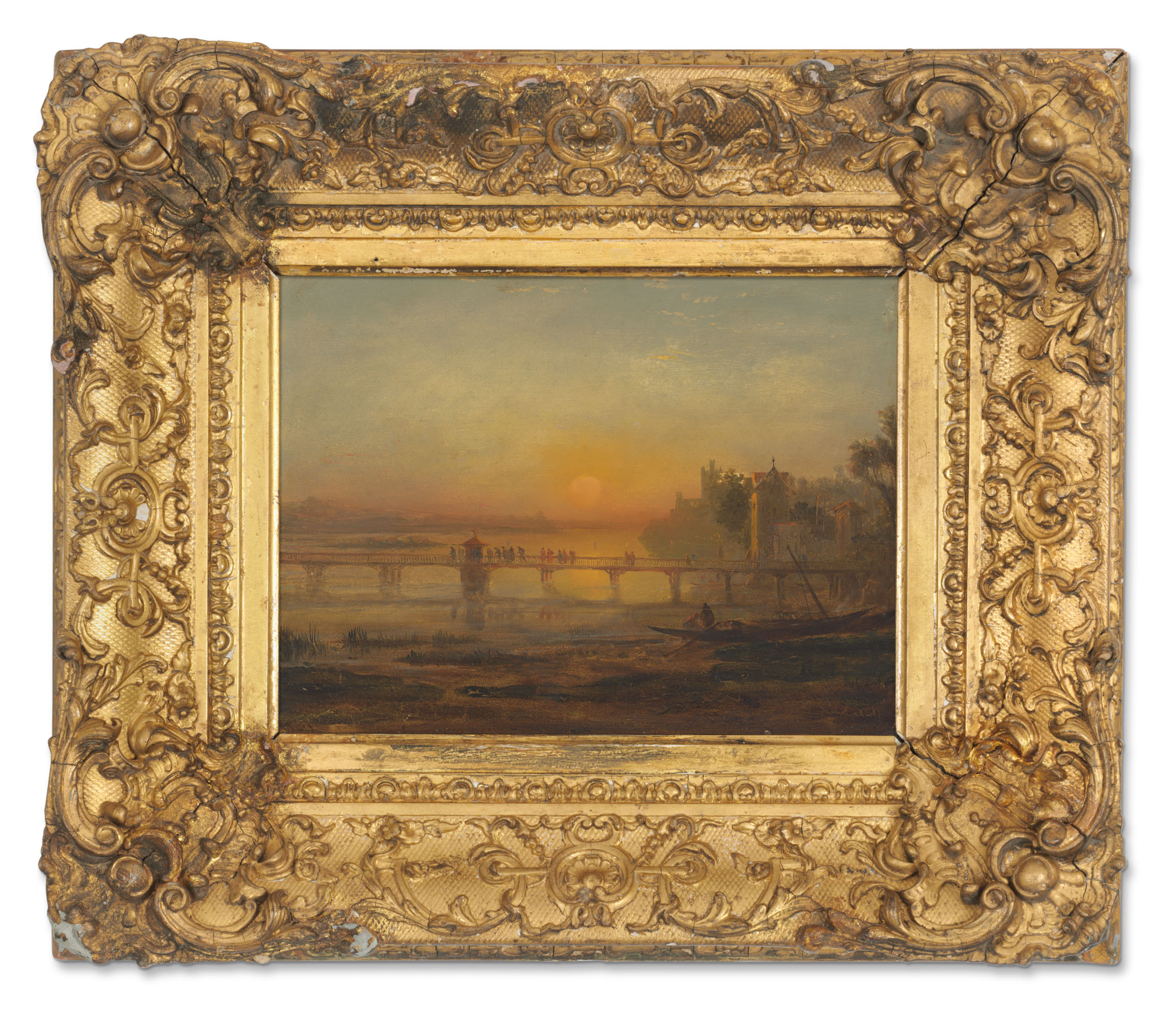
Morning on the Banks of Lake Zurich with Pilgrims by Francis Danby

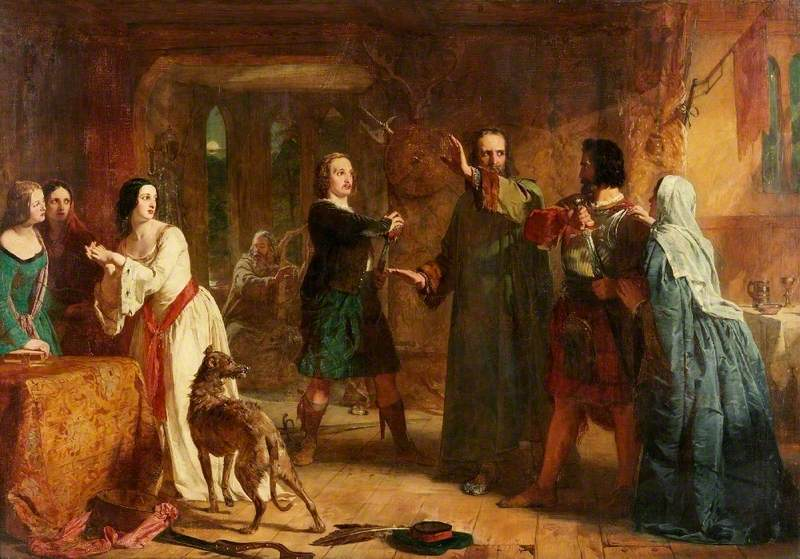
The Lady of the Lake by Alexander Johnston

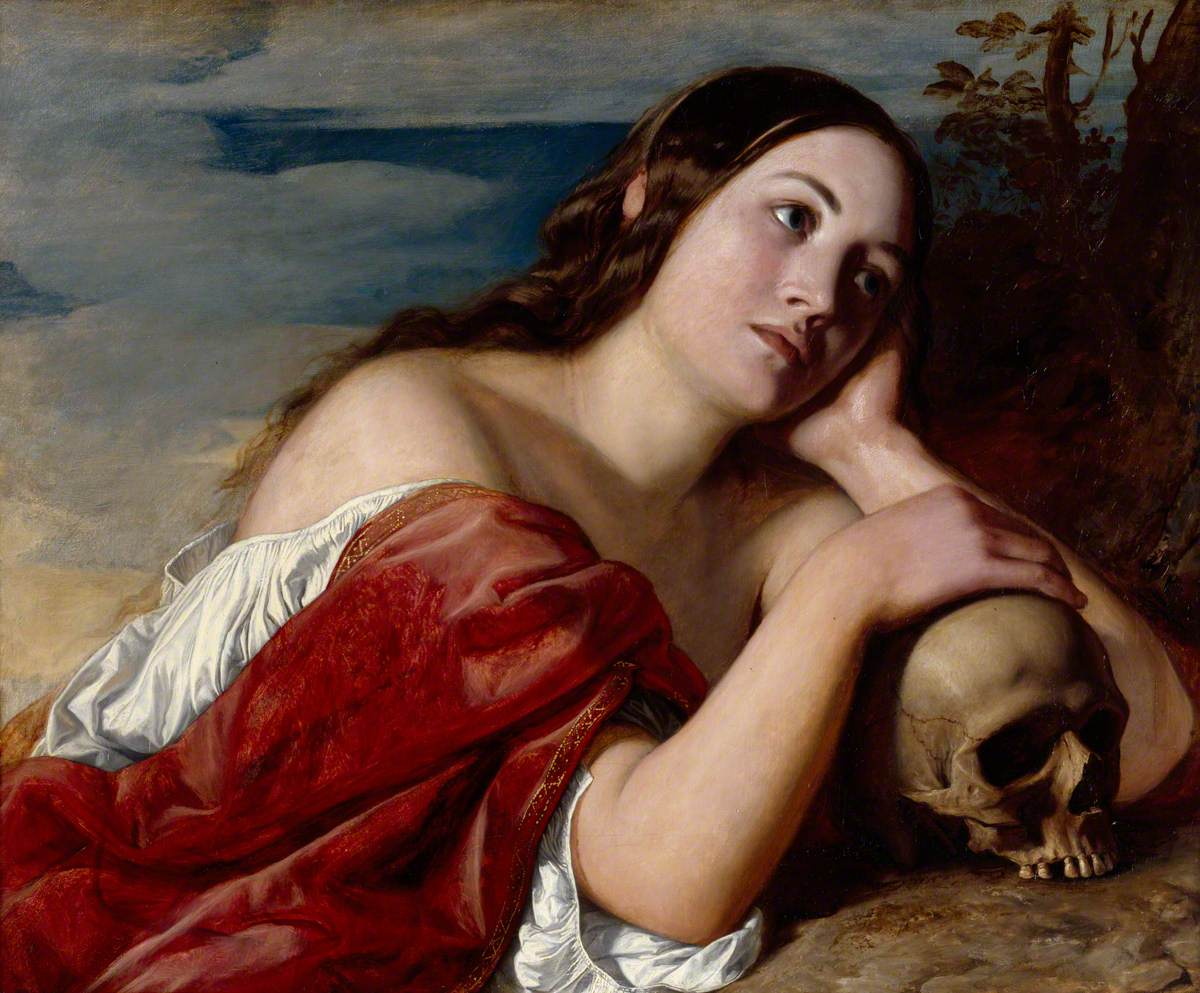
Omnia Vanitas by William Dyce

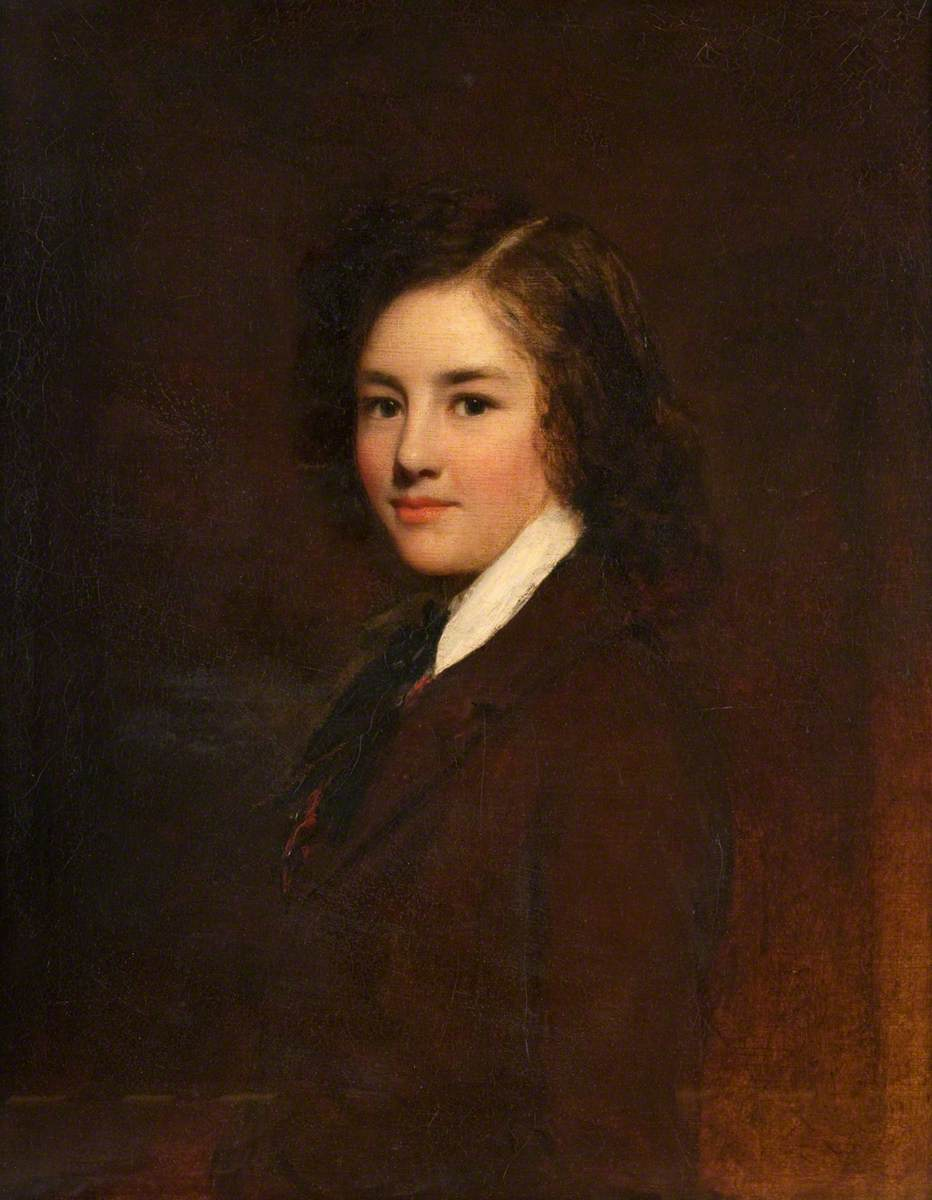
Portrait of James McNeill Whistler by William Boxall

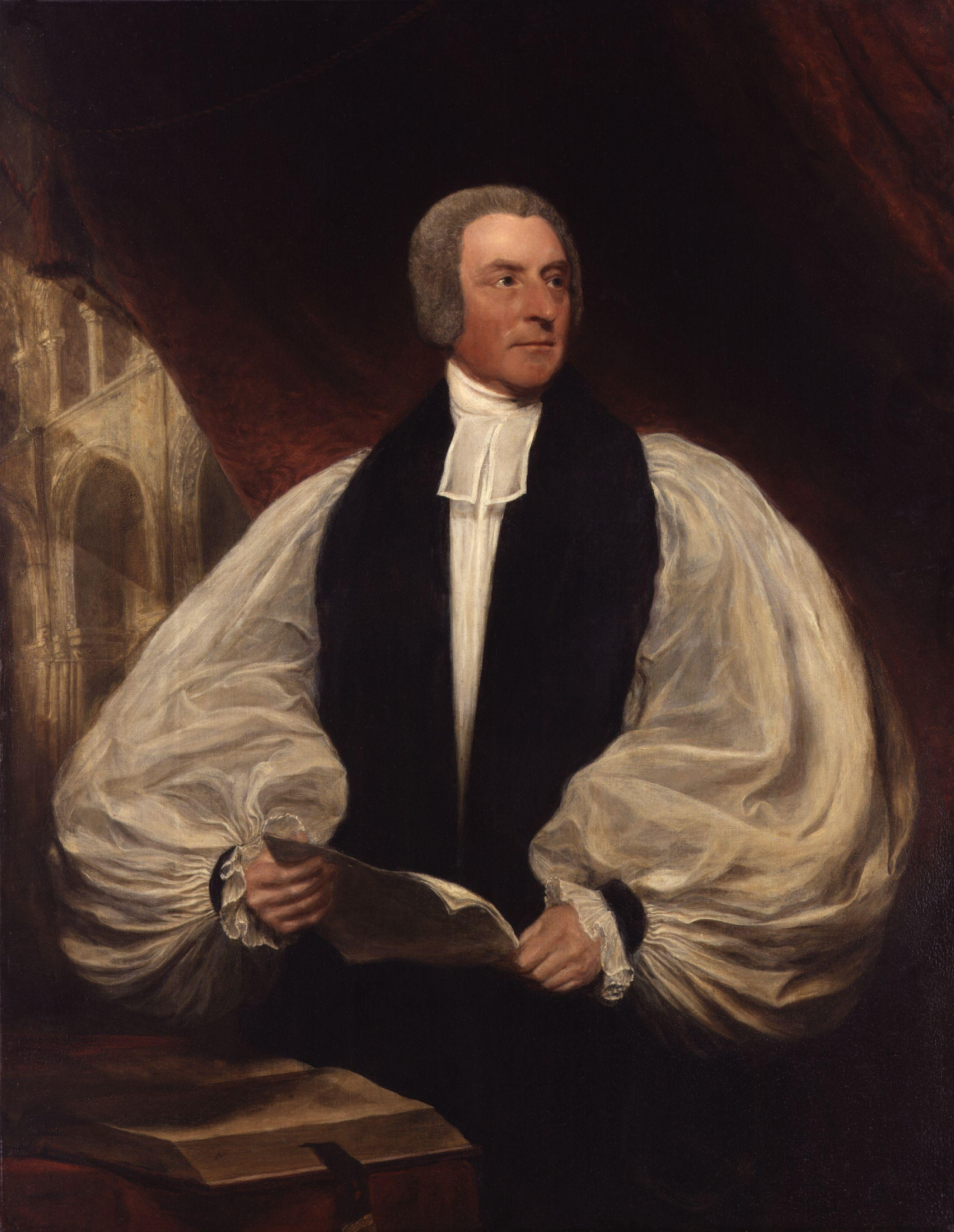
Portrait of George Murray by Samuel Lane

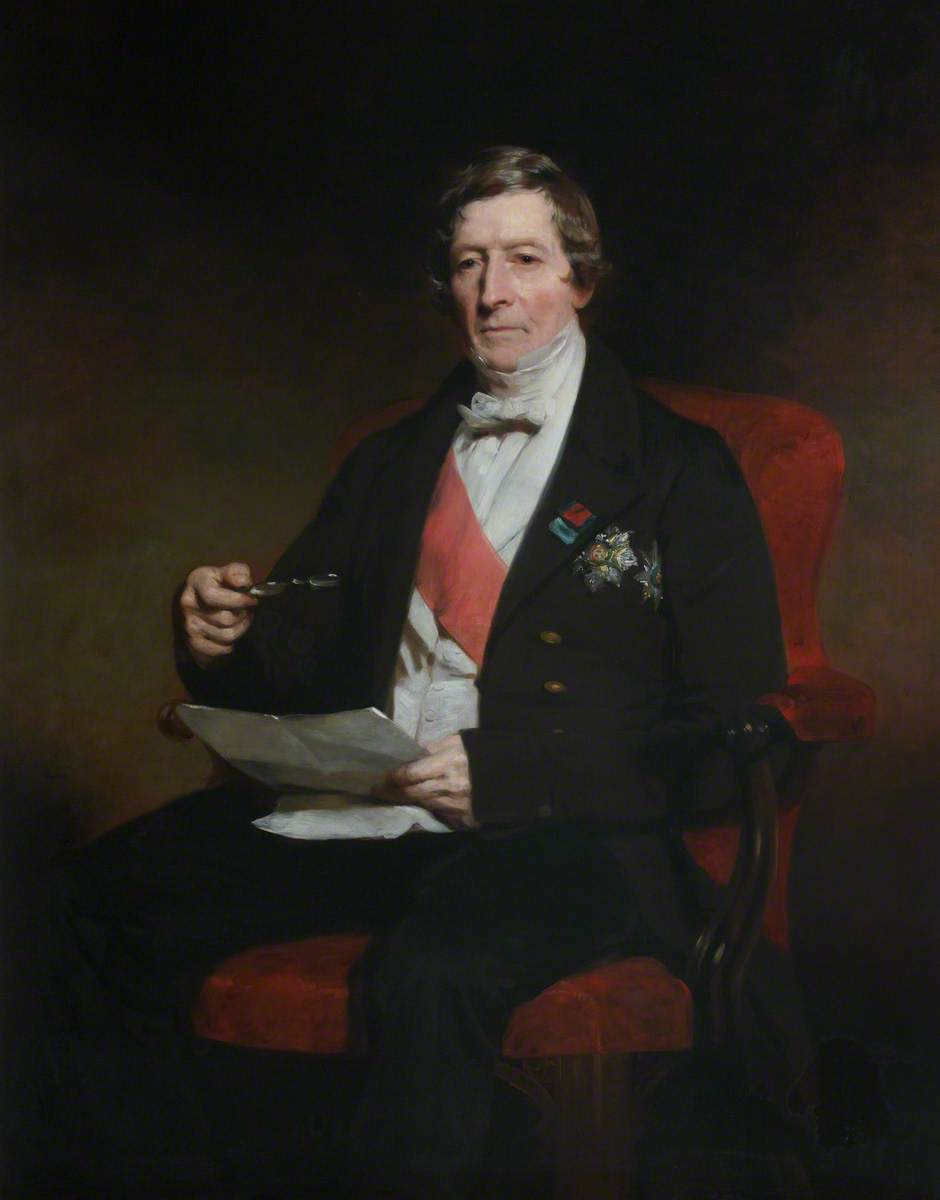
Portrait of Thomas Brisbane by John Watson Gordon

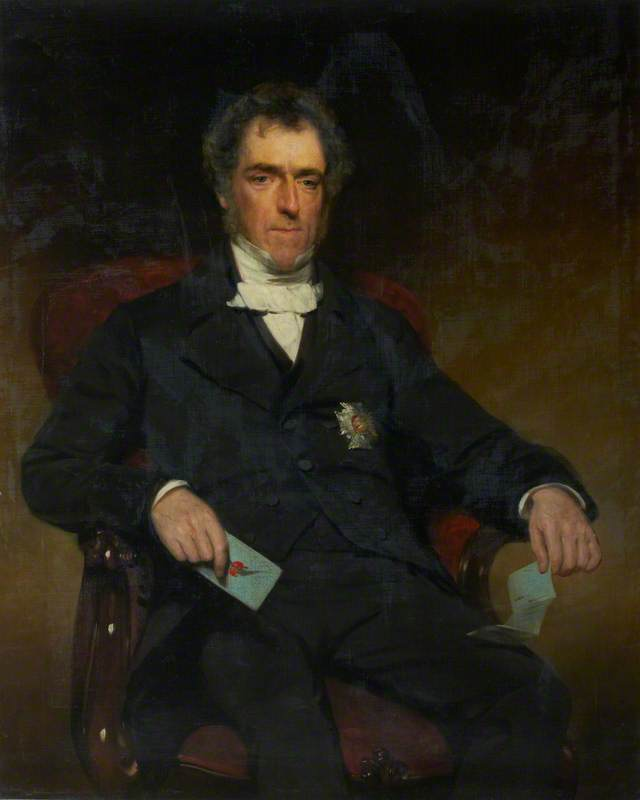
Portrait of John Shaw Lefevre by John Watson Gordon

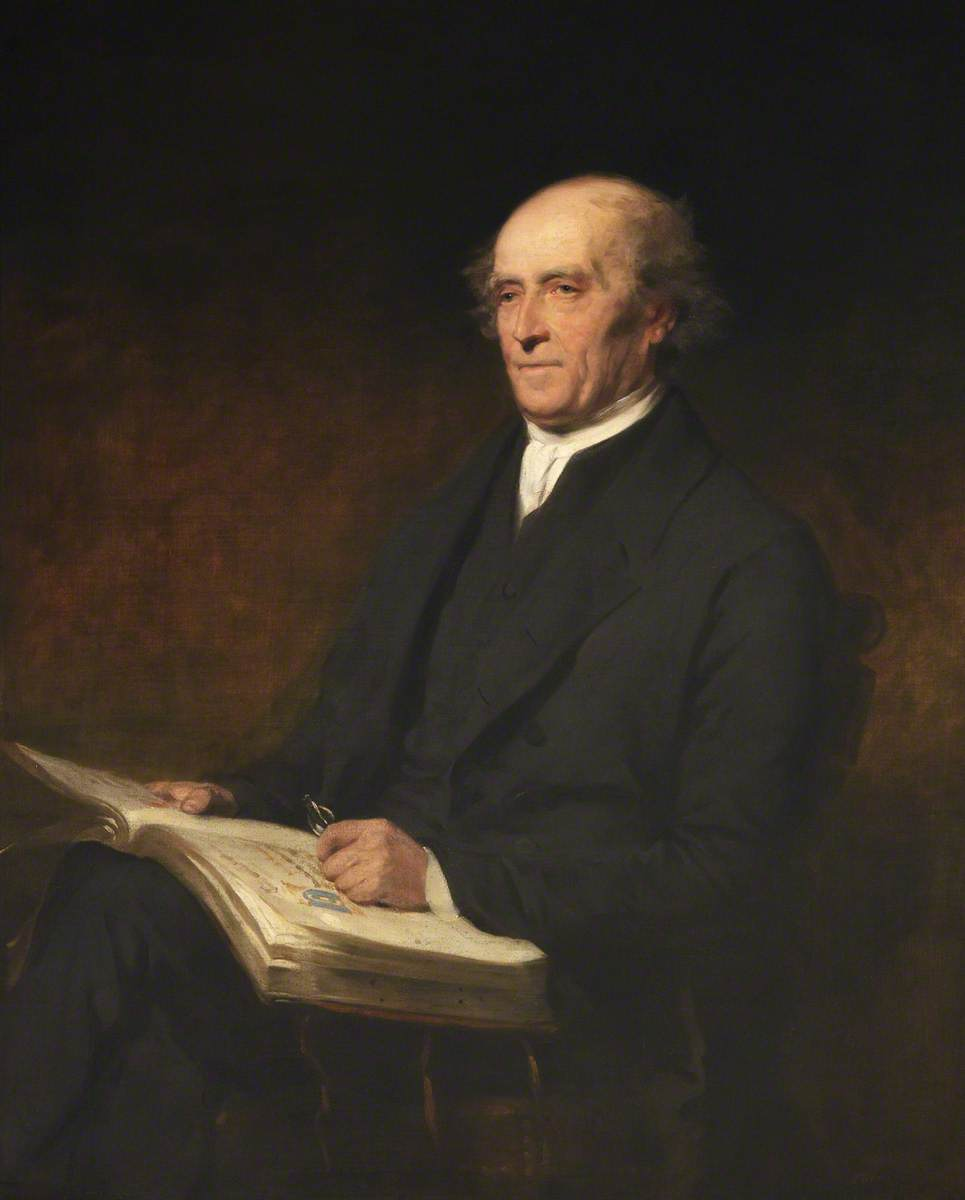
Portrait of John Lee by John Watson Gordon

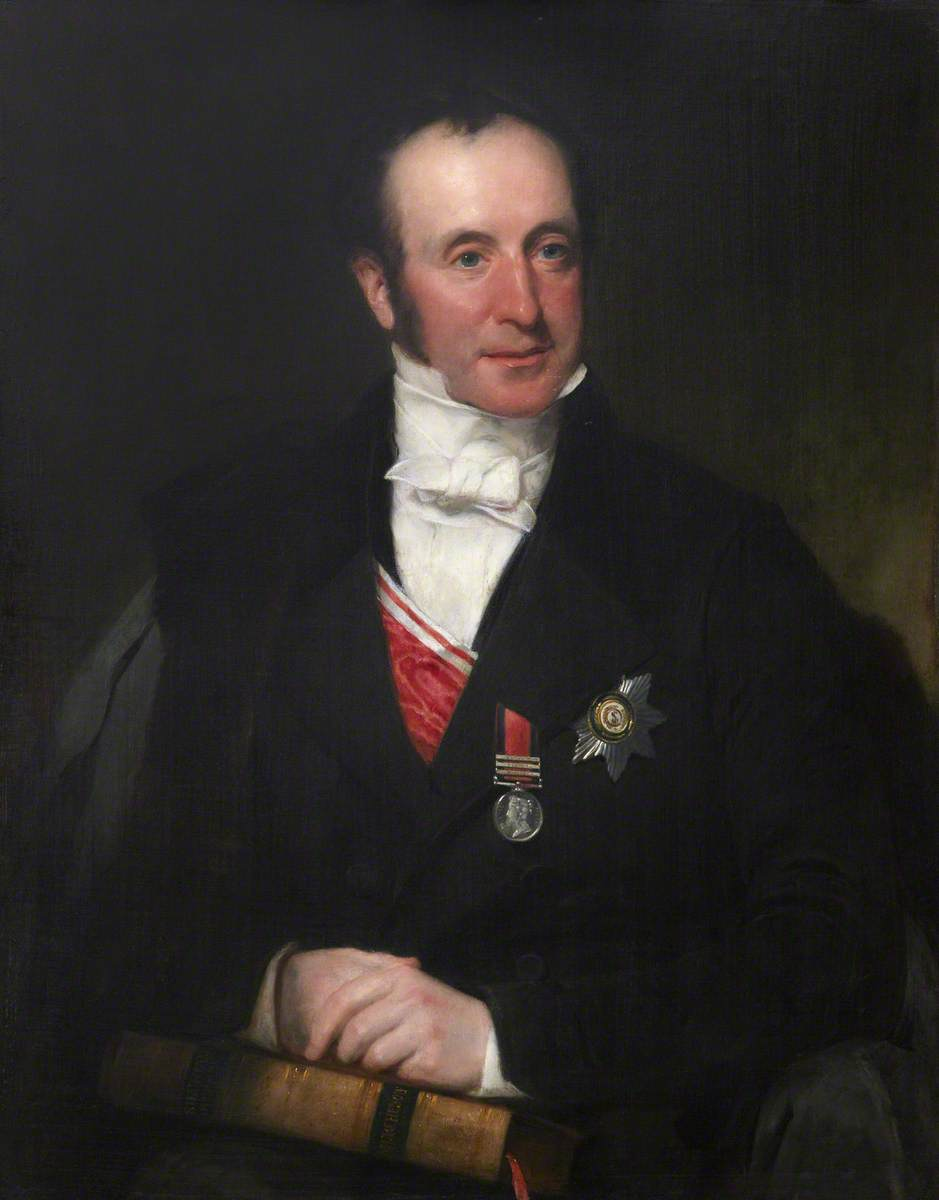
Portrait of Roderick Murchison by Henry William Pickersgill

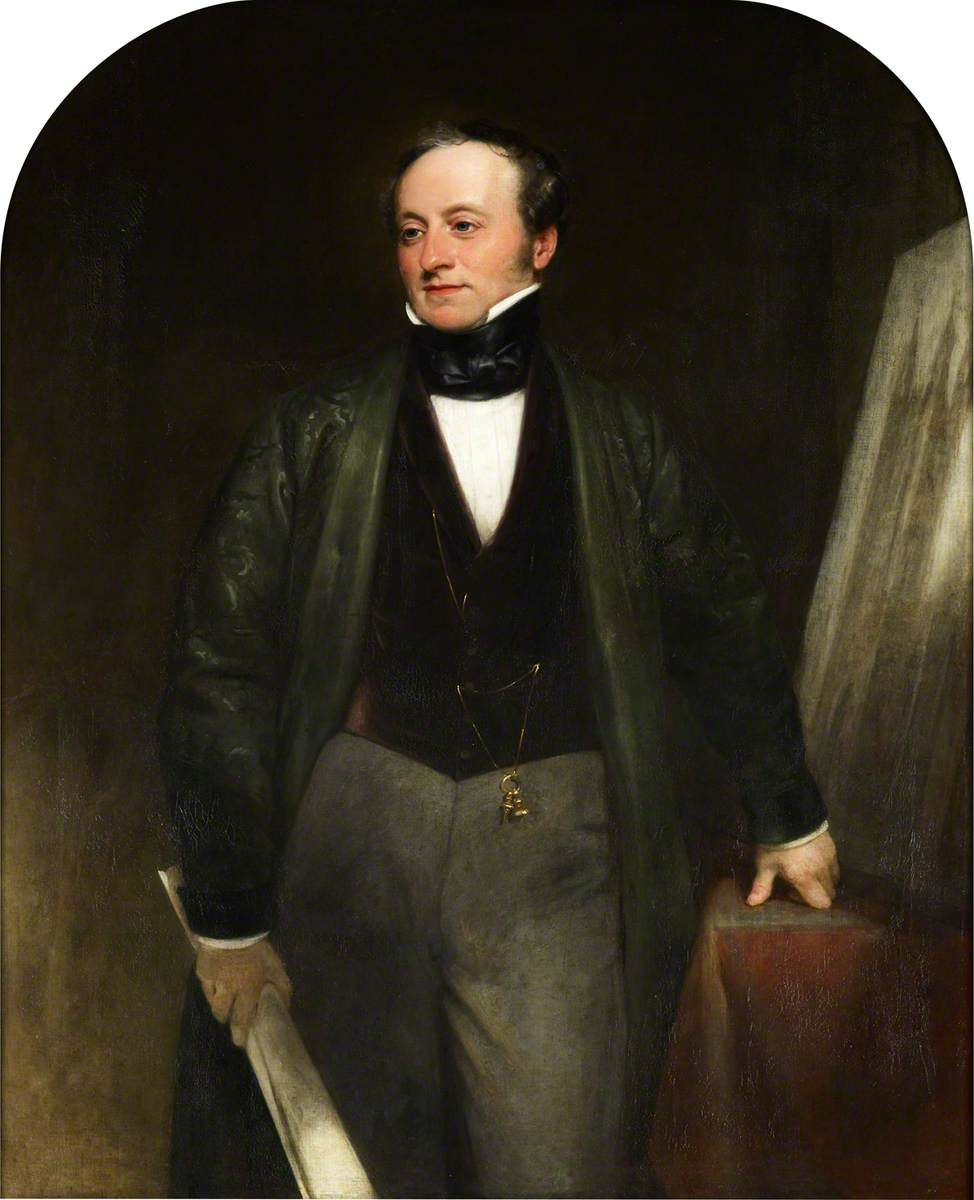
Portrait of Charles Barry by Henry William Pickersgill

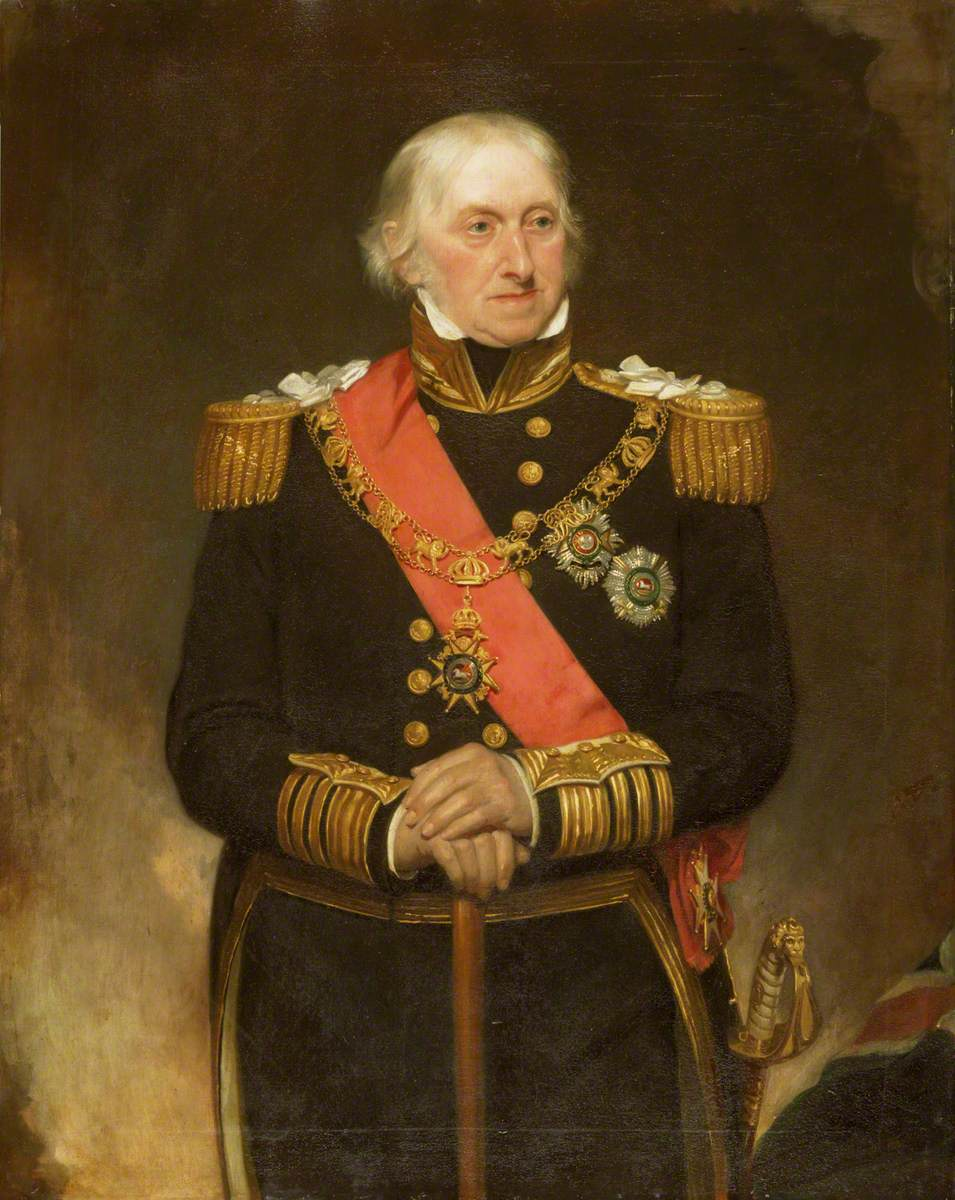
Portrait of Edward Owen by Henry William Pickersgill

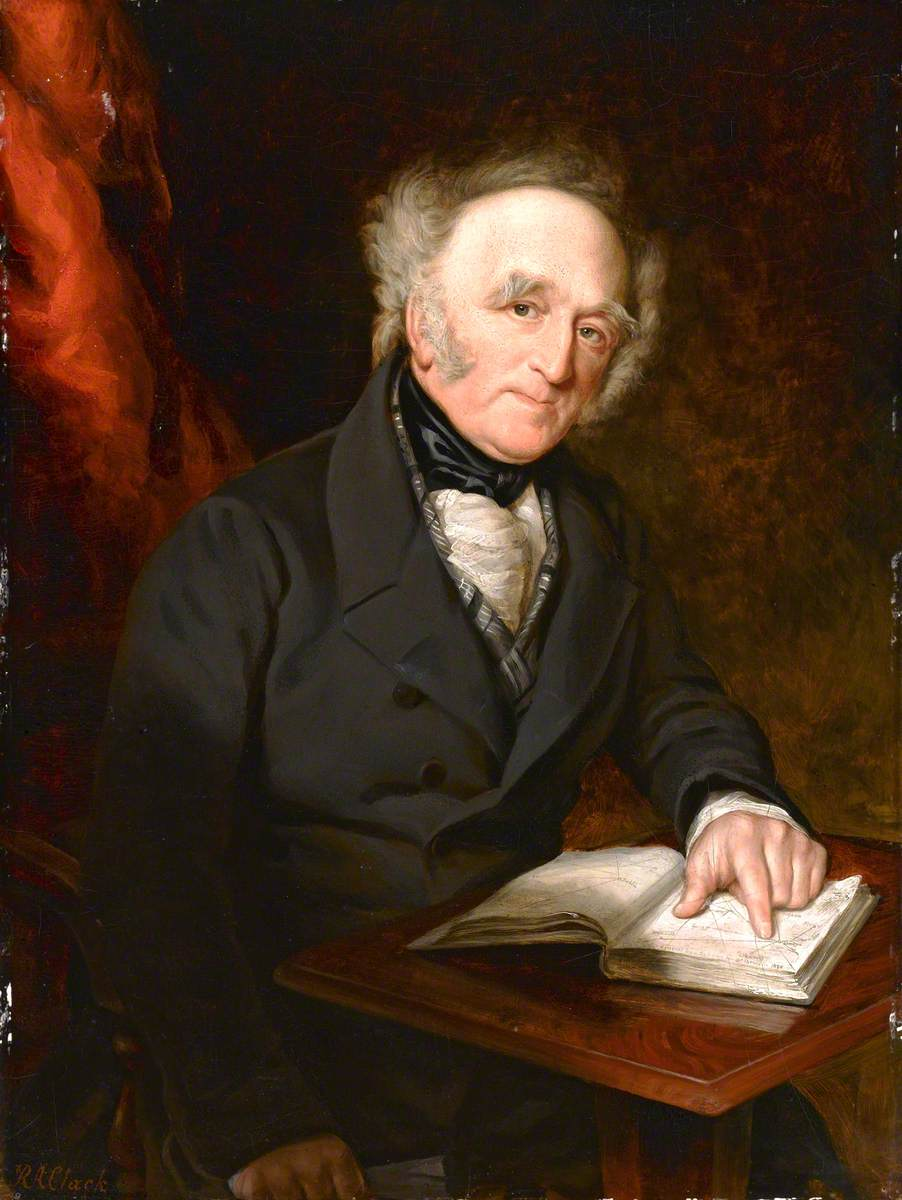
Portrait of Thomas Gray by Richard Augustus Clack

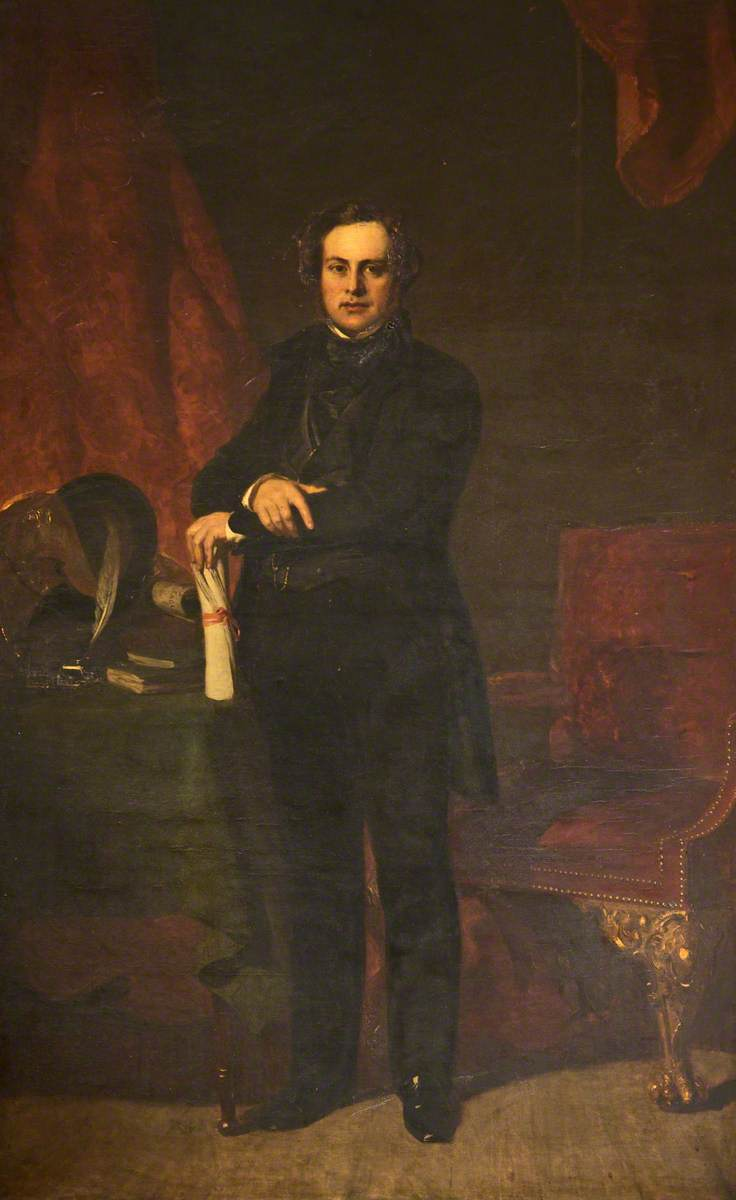
Portrait of John Bright by John Prescott Knight

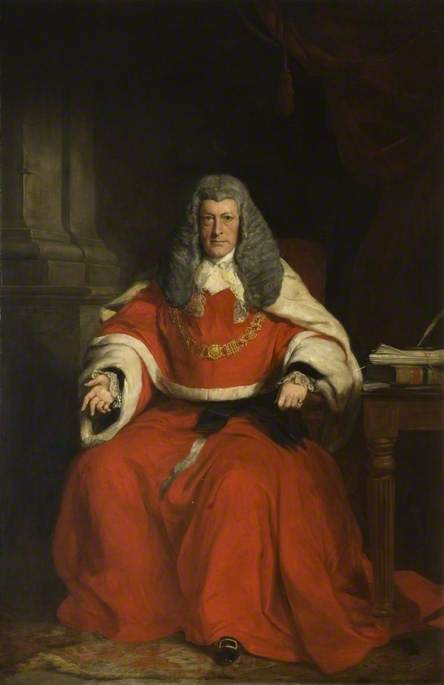
Portrait of Frederick Pollock by Francis Grant

Viscount Hardinge on the Battlefield of Ferozeshah by Francis Grant

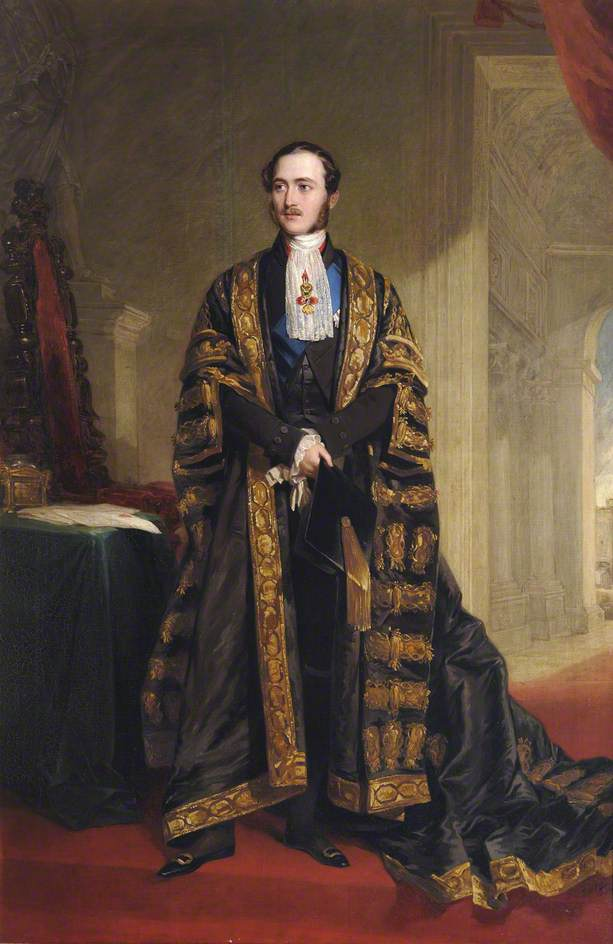
Portrait of Prince Albert by Frederick Richard Say

== Bibliography ==
- Bailey, Anthony. J.M.W. Turner: Standing in the Sun. Tate Enterprises, 2013.
- Fitzmaurice, Andrew. King Leopold's Ghostwriter: The Creation of Persons and States in the Nineteenth Century. Princeton University Press, 2024.
- Spencer-Longhurst, Paul. The Sun Rising Through Vapour: Turner's Early Seascapes. Third Millennium Information, 2003.
- Van der Merwe, Pieter & Took, Roger. The Spectacular career of Clarkson Stanfield. Tyne and Wear County Council Museums, 1979.
