= Portrait of James McNeill Whistler =

Painting by William Boxall

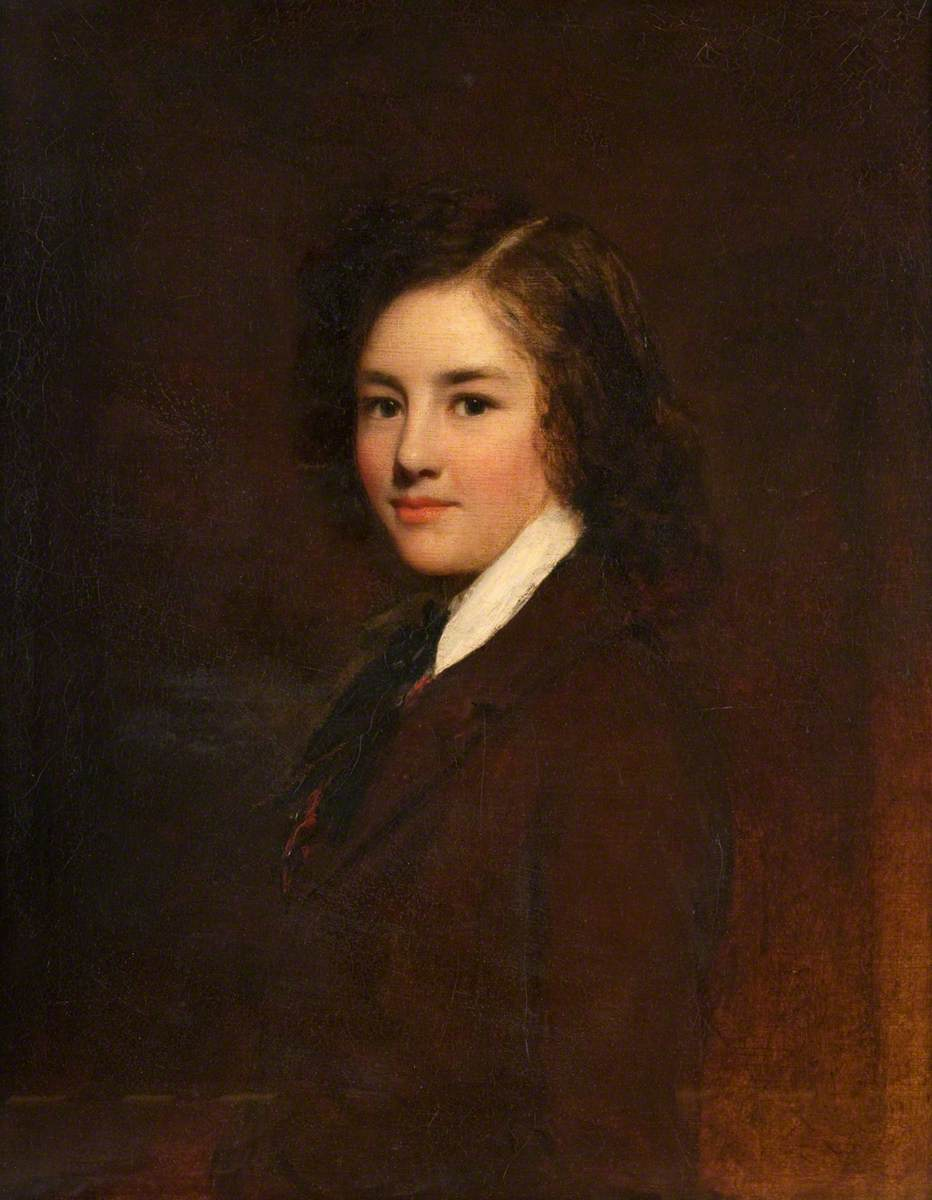
- Artist: William Boxall
- Year: 1848
- Type: Oil on canvas, portrait painting
- Dimensions: 76.5 cm × 62.3 cm (30.1 in × 24.5 in)
- Location: Hunterian Museum and Art Gallery, Glasgow

Portrait of James McNeill Whistler is an 1848 portrait painting by the British artist William Boxall. It depicts the American-born future artist James McNeill Whistler at the age of fourteen. Whistler had spent many of his early years in Saint Petersburg before relocating to England and had shown an early aptitude for drawing.

The painting was commissioned by the boy's father George Washington Whistler, the railway engineer. Boxall also acted as an art teacher to Whistler honing his technique. Best known for his portraits, he was himself later elected as a member of the Royal Academy.

The painting was displayed at the Royal Academy Exhibition of 1849 held at the National Gallery in London, where it was praised by critics for being "fine in expression" and "beautiful in colour". The painting is now in the collection of the Hunterian Museum and Art Gallery in Glasgow, which acquired it in 1935.

== Bibliography ==
- Denker, Eric. In Pursuit of the Butterfly: Portraits of James McNeill Whistler. National Portrait Gallery, 1995.
- Sutherland, Daniel E. Whistler: A Life for Art's Sake. Yale University Press, 3014.
