= Tilbury Fort - Wind Against Tide =

Painting by Clarkson Stanfield

Tilbury Fort - Wind Against
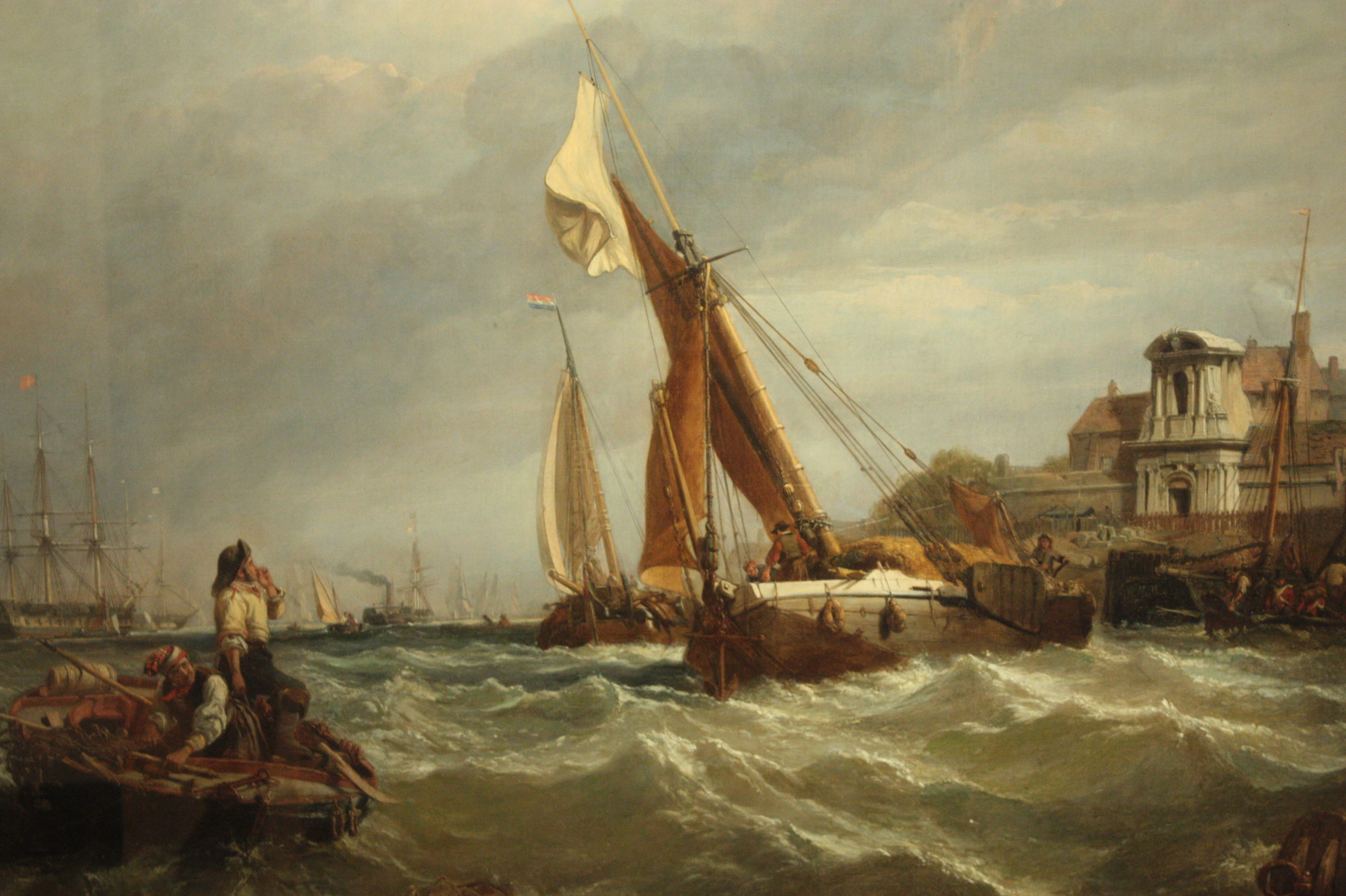
- Reduced version of the painting. The original is horizontal
- Artist: Clarkson Stanfield
- Year: 1849
- Medium: Oil on canvas, landscape painting
- Dimensions: 176 cm × 153 cm (69 in × 60 in)
- Location: Port of London Authority; London

Tlbury Fort - Wind Against Tide is an 1849 landscape painting by the British artist Clarkson Stanfield. It depicts a view of Tilbury Fort on the River Thames. Two hay barges and a peter boat are in the foreground.

The painting was displayed at the Royal Academy Exhibition of 1849 at the National Gallery. It was acquired and presented as a gift for the railway engineer Robert Stephenson when he retired from the board of the London and North Western Railway. It again featured at the Salon of 1855 in Paris. Today it is in the collection of the Port of London Authority but as of 2025 it is on loan to the Museum of the Docklands. Several versions exist of the painting and James Tibbits Willmore produced an engraving based on it.

== Bibliography ==
- Bailey, Michael. Robert Stephenson – The Eminent Engineer. Taylor & Francis, 2017.
- Van der Merwe, Pieter & Took, Roger. The Spectacular career of Clarkson Stanfield. Tyne and Wear County Council Museums, 1979.
