= Drawing for the Militia =

Painting by John Phillip

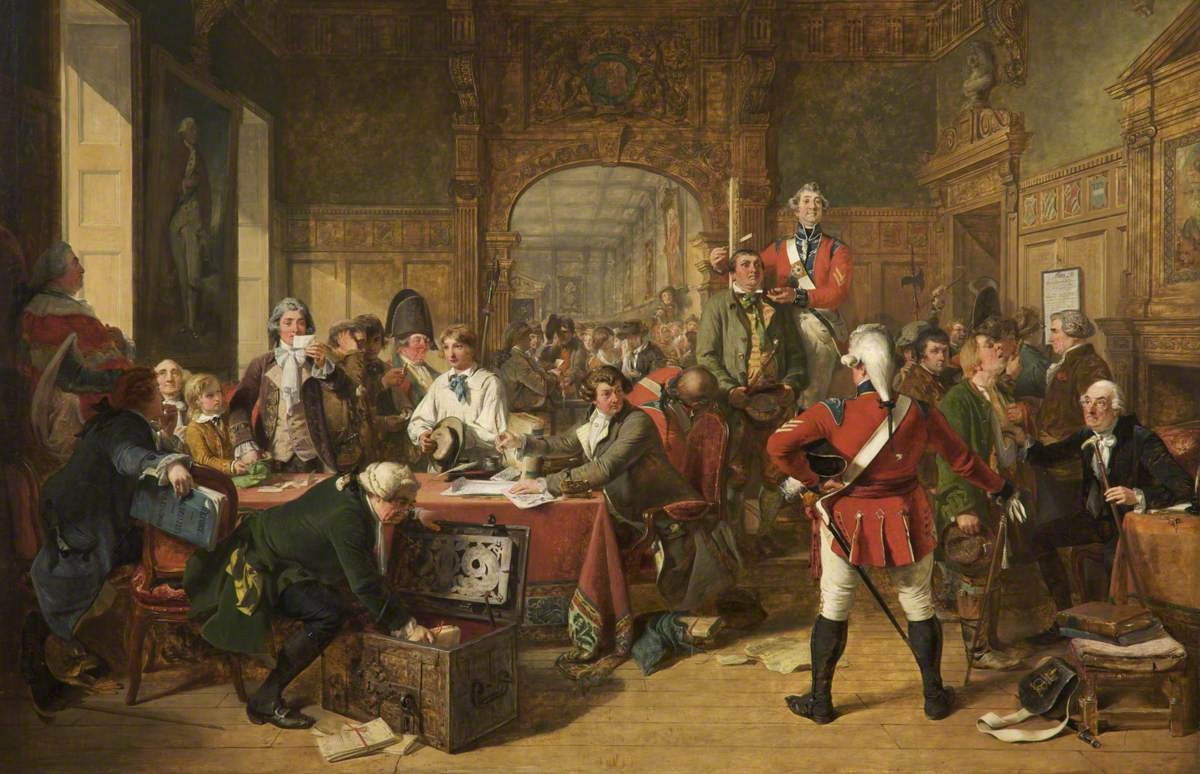
- Artist: John Phillip
- Year: 1849
- Type: Oil on canvas, genre painting
- Dimensions: 122 cm × 186 cm (48 in × 73 in)
- Location: Bury Art Museum, Greater Manchester

Drawing for the Militia is an oil on canvas genre painting by the Scottish artist John Phillip, from 1849.

== History ==
It belongs to the first period of Phillip's career, before he switched to painting scenes of Spain. It is set shortly after the French Revolution of 1789 and portrays the recruitment of the British Militia to defend against the threat of invasion. A portrait of George III hangs on the left hand side of the bustling scene.

It was exhibited at the Summer Exhibition of 1849 of the Royal Academy at the National Gallery. It was his only work displayed that year and was praised by the London Illustrated News. Today it is the collection of the Bury Art Museum in Greater Manchester. An oil sketch made in preparation for the work is now in the Aberdeen Art Gallery.

== See also ==
- The Clique, artistic group with which Phillip was associated

== Bibliography ==
- Gaunt, William. The Restless Century: Painting in Britain, 1800-1900. Phaidon, 1972.
