= The Wreck Buoy =

Painting by J. M. W. Turner

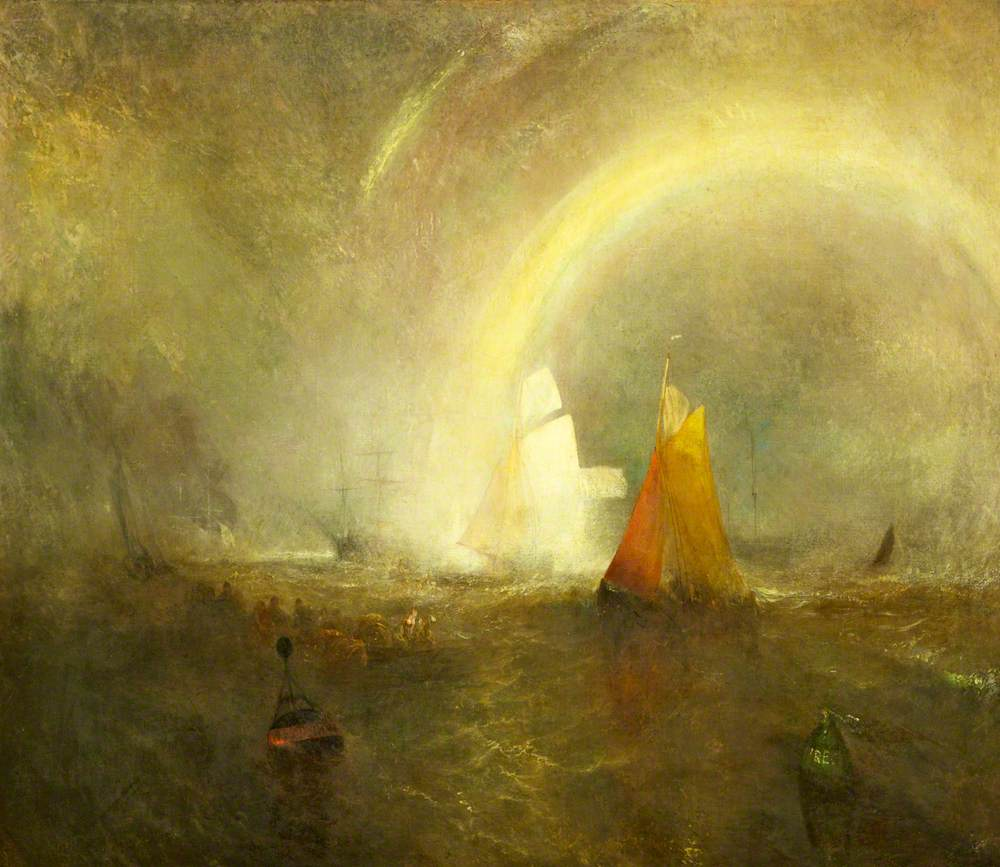
- Artist: J. M. W. Turner
- Year: 1849
- Type: Oil on canvas, seascape
- Dimensions: 92.7 cm × 123.3 cm (36.5 in × 48.5 in)
- Location: Sudley House; Liverpool

'The Wreck Buoy' is an 1849 oil painting by the British artist J.M.W. Turner. The art critic John Ruskin described it "the last oil he painted before his noble hand forgot its cunning". The painting had originally been produced around 1807, but Turner was dissatisfied with it and took it back from its owner to make extensive changes to the canvas.

The work was displayed at the Royal Academy Exhibition of 1849 at the National Gallery in London, at Turner's penultimate appearance at the Royal Academy's Summer Exhibitions. Today the painting is in the collection of the Sudley House in Liverpool, having been acquired in 1944.

== See also ==
- List of paintings by J. M. W. Turner

== Bibliography ==
- Bailey, Anthony. J.M.W. Turner: Standing in the Sun. Tate Enterprises Ltd, 2013.
- Costello, Leo. J.M.W. Turner and the Subject of History. Routledge, 2017.
- Hamilton, James (ed.) Turner and Italy. National Galleries of Scotland, 2009.
- Reynolds, Graham. Turner. Thames & Hudson, 2022.
- Spencer-Longhurst, Paul. The Sun Rising Through Vapour: Turner's Early Seascapes. Third Millennium Information, 2003.
