= Omnia Vanitas =

Painting by William Dyce

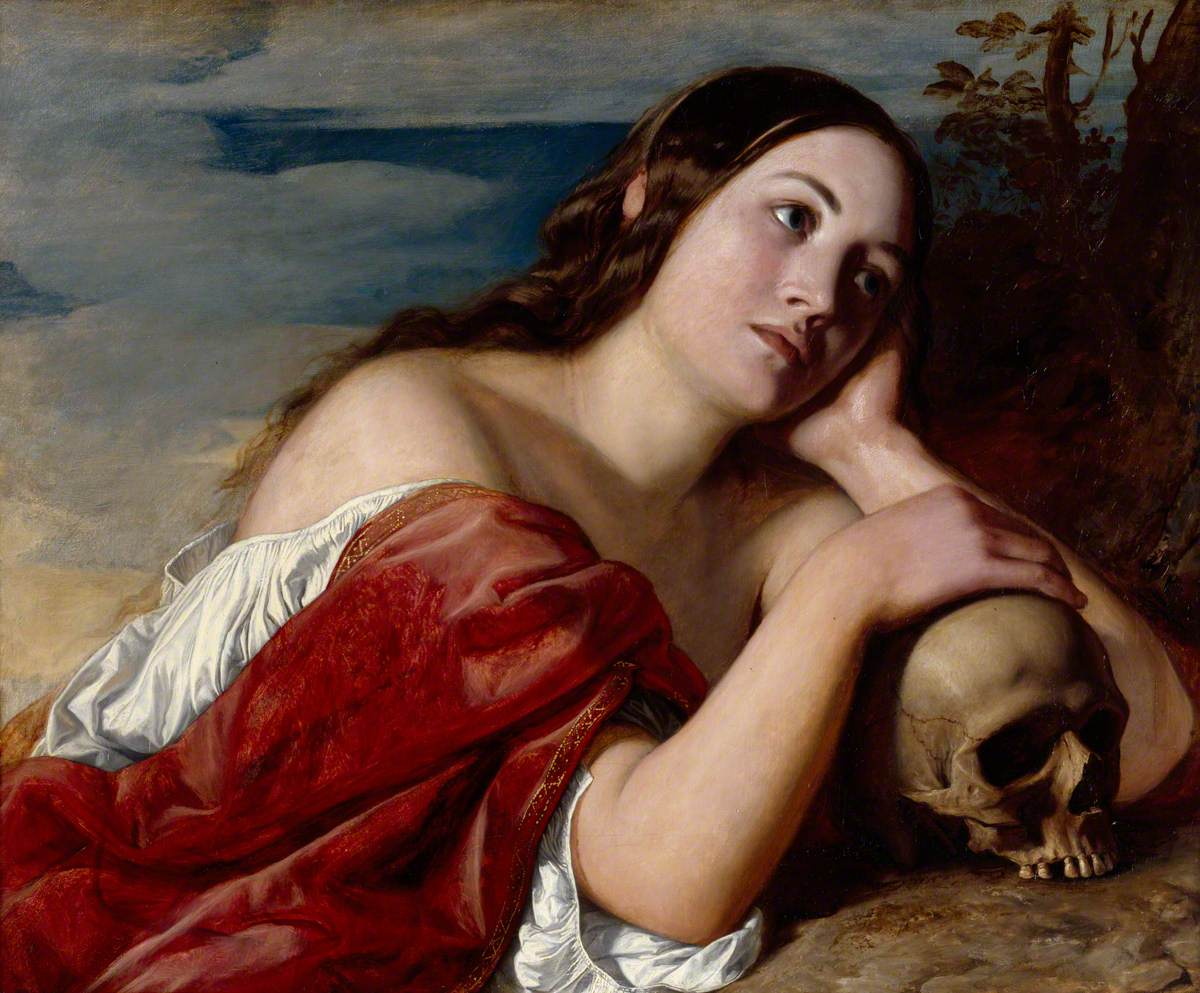
- Artist: William Dyce
- Year: 1848
- Type: Oil on canvas, genre painting
- Dimensions: 62.7 cm × 75 cm (24.7 in × 30 in)
- Location: Royal Academy of Arts, London

Omnia Vanitas is an 1848 oil painting by the Scottish artist William Dyce. It depicts a young woman leaning against a skull. The woman has been interpreted as fallen woman representing Mary Magdalene. The title is Latin for All Is Vanity and is drawn from the biblical text of Ecclesiastes. In the composition Dyce references both Renaissance Art and the more recent German Romantic Nazarene movement. Stylistically, Dyce was a significant forerunner of the Pre-Raphaelite Brotherhood.

The painting was displayed at the Royal Academy Exhibition of 1849 held at the National Gallery in London. Today it is part of the collection of the Royal Academy of Arts in Piccadilly, having been presented by Dyce as his diploma work when he was elected as a Royal Academician the previous year.

== Bibliography ==
- Boime, Albert. Art in an Age of Counterrevolution, 1815-1848. University of Chicago Press, 2004
- Pointon, Marcia R. William Dyce, 1806-1864: A Critical Biography. Oxford University Press, 1979.
