= Alfred Provis =

English painter and draughtsman

Alfred Provis (18 February 1818 – 8 August 1890) was an English painter and draughtsman.

== Biography ==
He was born on 18 February 1818 in Chippenham in a house now called Orwell house at 54-55 New Road, son of John Provis, a timber merchant and builder, and Ann Banks. He left Chippenham at an early age, and studied in London with John Wood (1801 – 1870) history and portrait painter. Except for very short periods, the young artist remained in London. He specialised in Victorian charming domestic interior scenes in cottages and farmhouses with ladies and children painted with a palette of luminous brown. He exhibited over 100 paintings at the Royal Academy, Suffolk Street, British Institution and Society of British Artists from 1846 to 1876. He lived in Brentford Ealing near London and then at Kingston Lisle, where he was also occupied with Berkshire scenes; he often left England for some months and travelled in North Wales, Brittany and Normandy. His works are shown in the collections of the V&A Museum, Aberdeen Art Gallery, Atkinson Art Gallery and Library and other public collections. In some paintings the artist represented his cottage at Kingston Lisle Wantage, Berks and the subjects in these genre paintings are of the artist's own family, his wife, Ellen Andrews, married in 1851, and his two daughters, Mary and Ellen Agnes. Ellen died in 1911 at the age of 57; she was an engineer who in 1891 married Vaughan Cornish, scientist and geographer and director of technical education to the Hampshire County Council. Provis died on 8 August 1890 in his beloved cottage on Kingston Lisle.

== Artwork ==
Provis’s works depict domestic scenes in rustic cottages, often highlighting detailed interiors and everyday objects. His palette frequently includes shades of brown, and his compositions show furniture, kitchen utensils, fireplaces, baskets of produce, and pets within the rooms. Many paintings portray activities such as reading, preparing meals, sewing, or childcare, capturing the routines of daily life in these settings.

== Works ==
- “Minding Baby”, Oil on canvas, V&A Museum of Childhood
- “A Dog's Lesson”, dated 1860, Oil on canvas, Victoria and Albert Museum.
- “Feeding Time”, Oil on canvas, Wolverhampton Art Gallery
- “Interior, Girl Reading”, Oil on canvas, Ferens Art Gallery
- “Interior, Lady Knitting”, Oil on canvas, Ferens Art Gallery
- “A Cottage Interior” Oil on canvas, Atkinson Art Gallery Collection
- “A Woman Watching Chickens”, Oil on canvas, Wolverhampton Art Gallery
- “The Blacksmith's Forge”, Oil on canvas, Aberdeen Art Gallery & Museums
- “Cottage Interior”, Oil on canvas, Bury Art Museum
- “Harvest Ale”, Oil on canvas, Harris Museum & Art Gallery
- “A lady knutting”, Oil on canvas, dated 1880, Hull museum.
- “A cottage interior in Kingstone Lisle Wantage, Berks” Alfred Provis's cottage, Oil on canvas, dated 1876.
