= Rienzi (novel) =

1835 novel by Edward Bulwer-Lytton

- Author: Edward Bulwer-Lytton
- Language: English
- Genre: Historical novel
- Publisher: Saunders and Otley
- Publication date: 1835
- Publication place: United Kingdom
- Media type: Print

Rienzi: The Last of the Tribunes is an 1835 historical novel by the British writer Edward Bulwer-Lytton. Published in three volumes, it was inspired by the life of the 14th century Italian politician Cola di Rienzo.

The German composer Richard Wagner based his 1842 opera Rienzi on the novel. The English Pre-Raphaelite artist William Holman Hunt created an 1849 painting, Rienzi, drawn from a scene in the novel. He displayed it at the Royal Academy Exhibition of 1849 with a quote from the novel.

== Bibliography ==
- Collins, Amanda. Greater Than Emperor: Cola Di Rienzo (ca. 1313-54) and the World of Fourteenth-century Rome. University of Michigan Press, 2002.
- Huckvale, David. A Dark and Stormy Oeuvre: Crime, Magic and Power in the Novels of Edward Bulwer-Lytton. McFarland, 2015.
