= Rienzi vowing to obtain justice for the death of his young brother, slain in a skirmish between the Colonna and the Orsini factions =

Painting by William Holman Hunt

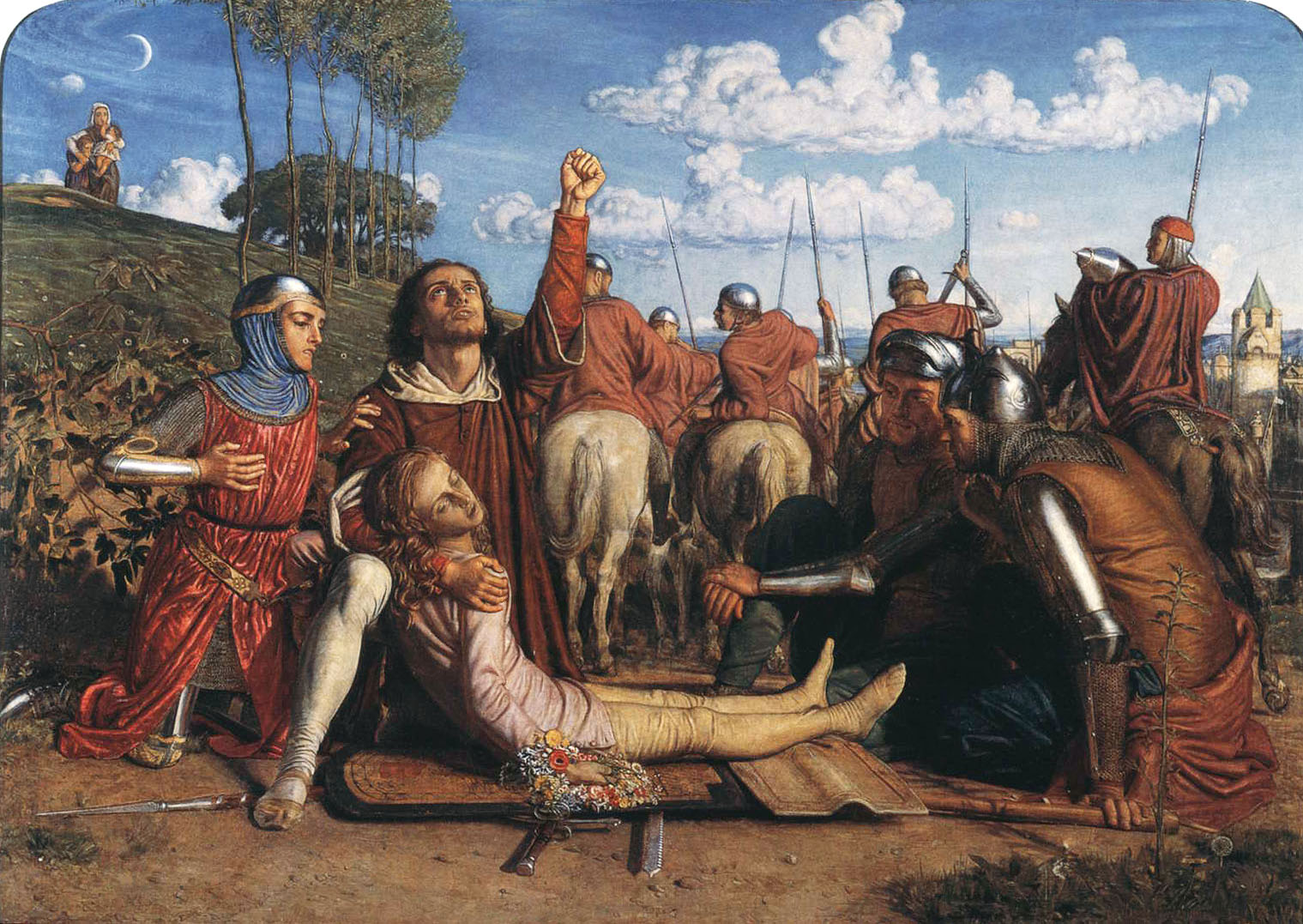
- Artist: William Holman Hunt
- Year: 1849
- Medium: oil on canvas
- Dimensions: 86.3 cm × 122 cm (34.0 in × 48 in)
- Location: Private collection of Mrs E. M. Clarke

Rienzi vowing to obtain justice for the death of his young brother, slain in a skirmish between the Colonna and the Orsini factions (or simply, Rienzi) is an oil-on-canvas painting by the English artist William Holman Hunt, produced in 1849 and currently in a private collection.

This painting was the first of Hunt's works to include 'PRB' (Pre-Raphaelite Brotherhood) on the canvas. The extremely long title was not atypical of Victorian paintings, especially history paintings.

== History ==
Hunt took his subject from the 1835 novel Rienzi, the Last of the Roman Tribunes, by Bulwer Lytton, about Cola di Rienzi (1313–1354), a papal notary who led a popular uprising in Rome. It was exhibited at the Royal Academy's Summer Exhibition of 1849 (alongside Millais' Lorenzo and Isabella) with the following excerpt from the novel, describing the hero's reaction to the incident:

But for that event, the future liberator of Rome might have been but a dreamer, a scholar, a poet, - the peaceful rival of Petrarch - a man of thoughts, not deeds. But from that time, all his faculties, energies, fancies, genius, became concentrated to a single point and patriotism, before a vision, leaped into the life and vigour of a passion.

— Rienzi, the Last of the Roman Tribunes, Book I, chap. 1, 23

In 1847, Hunt repeatedly sat up all night to finish John Ruskin's Modern Painters (1843); in Rienzi he attempted to put into practice all that he had read. The background particularly was painted in careful detail trying to satisfy Ruskin's stringent requirements. As can be seen from some of Hunt's later work, such as The Hireling Shepherd (1851) and The Awakening Conscience (1854), the artist often experienced great difficulty with painting his figures in natural poses. This is evident here in the portrayal of the soldier on the far left of the painting.

== See also ==
- List of Pre-Raphaelite paintings

== Bibliography ==
- Landow, George (1979). William Holman Hunt and Typological Symbolism. Yale University Press. ISBN 0-300-02196-8.
- Maas, Jeremy (1984). Holman Hunt and the Light of the World. Ashgate. ISBN 978-0-85967-683-0.
- Bronkhurst, Judith (2006). William Holman Hunt : A Catalogue Raisonné. Yale University Press. ISBN 978-0-300-10235-2.
- Lochnan, Katharine (2008). Holman Hunt and the Pre-Raphaelite Vision. Art Gallery of Toronto. ISBN 978-1-894243-57-5.
