= 1849 in art =

Events from the year 1849 in art.

== Events ==
- March – The Journal of Design and Manufactures is established by Henry Cole in London.
- 7 May – The Royal Academy Exhibition of 1849 opens at the National Gallery in London
- May
  - First exhibition of paintings by the Pre-Raphaelite Brotherhood, in London: John Everett Millais' Isabella and Holman Hunt's Rienzi at the Royal Academy summer exhibition and Dante Gabriel Rossetti's The Girlhood of Mary Virgin at the Institution for the Free Exhibition of Modern Art's "St. George's Gallery" on Knightsbridge next to Hyde Park Corner.
  - John Ruskin publishes The Seven Lamps of Architecture.
- Salon of 1849

== Awards ==
- Prix de Rome (for painting) – Gustave Boulanger

== Works ==
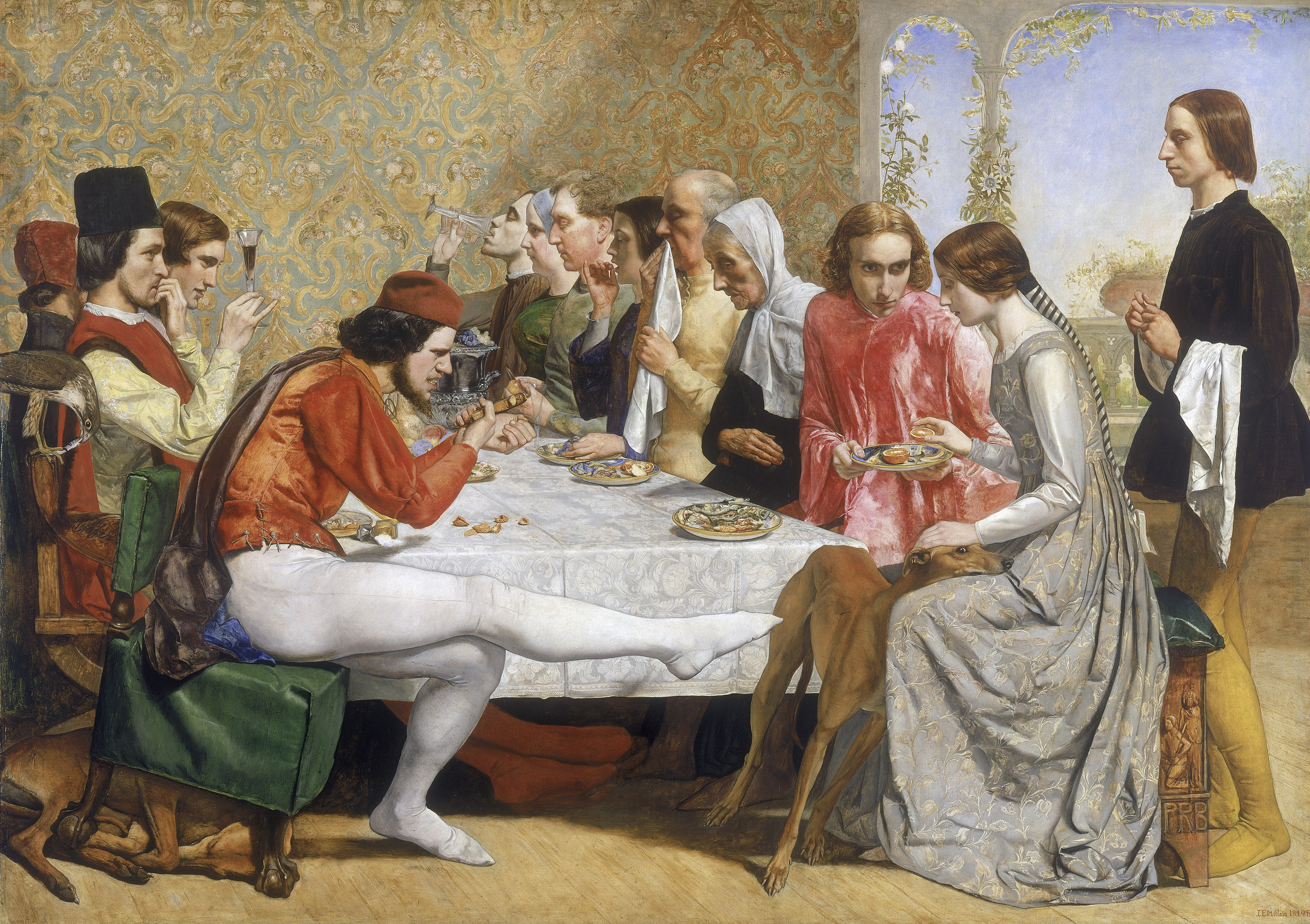
Isabella (Millais)

- Ivan Aivazovsky – Stormy Sea at Night
- Rosa Bonheur – Ploughing in the Nivernais
- Auguste Couder – The Tennis Court Oath, 20 June 1789
- Gustave Courbet
  - After Dinner at Ornans
  - Self-Portrait with Pipe
- Asher Brown Durand – Kindred Spirits
- Arthur Hughes – Musidora Bathing
- Frederick Goodall – The Village Post Office
- William Holman Hunt
  - The Haunted Manor
  - Rienzi vowing to obtain justice for the death of his young brother, slain in a skirmish between the Colonna and the Orsini factions
- Franz Krüger – Parade in Potsdam in 1817
- John Everett Millais – Isabella
- Andreas Müller – The Christ Child
- John O'Connor – Diorama of the Queen's Visit to Ireland
- Joseph Noel Paton – The Quarrel of Oberon and Titania
- John Phillip – Drawing for the Militia
- Clarkson Frederick Stanfield – Tilbury Fort - Wind Against Tide
- J.M.W. Turner – The Wreck Buoy
- Alexander von Kotzebue – Capture of Berlin

== Births ==
- January 12 – Jean Béraud, French painter (died 1935)
- April 29 – Méry Laurent, French muse and artist's model (Édouard Manet) (died 1900)
- June 2 – Paul-Albert Besnard, French painter (died 1934)
- August 12 – Abbott Handerson Thayer, American painter, naturalist and teacher (died 1921)
- November 25 – Mary Fraser Tytler, British craftswoman and designer (died 1938)
- December 19 – Henry Clay Frick, American art collector (died 1919)
- Christopher Whall, English stained-glass artist (died 1924)

== Deaths ==
- January 30 – Peter De Wint, English landscape painter (born 1784)
- February 11 – Luigi Ademollo, Italian painter (born 1764)
- February 15 – Francis Engleheart, English engraver (born 1775)
- March 5 – David Scott, Scottish historical painter (born 1806)
- March 14 – Ellen Sharples, English painter who specialized in portraits and watercolor miniatures (born 1769)
- March 18 – Antonin Moine, French romantic sculptor (born 1796)
- March 29 – Abraham Wivell, British portrait painter, writer and pioneer of fire protection (born 1786)
- May 18 – Samuel Amsler, Swiss engraver (born 1791)
- May 10 – Hokusai, Japanese artist, ukiyo-e painter and printmaker of the Edo period (born 1760)
- June 8 – Bianca Milesi, Italian writer, painter and patriot (born 1790)
- June 26 – Moses Haughton the younger, English engraver and painter of portrait miniatures (born 1773)
- August 21 – Moritz Michael Daffinger, Austrian miniature painter and sculptor (born 1790)
- August 23 – Edward Hicks, American folk artist (born 1780)
- August 25 – Adele Schopenhauer, German papercut artist and novelist (born 1797)
- September 7 – Richard Sass, English landscape painter, etcher, and drawing master to royalty (born 1774)
- November 11 – William Barnard, English mezzotint engraver (born 1774)
- November 13 – William Etty, English painter, especially of nudes (born 1787)
- November 21 – François Marius Granet, French painter (born 1777)
- December 4 – Jovan Pačić, Serbian painter and poet (born 1771)
- December 9 – John Glover, English-born Australian landscape painter (born 1767)
- December 27 – Jacques-Laurent Agasse, Swiss animal and landscape painter (born 1767)
