= Our English Coasts =

Painting by William Holman Hunt

Our English Coasts, 1852 ('Strayed Sheep')
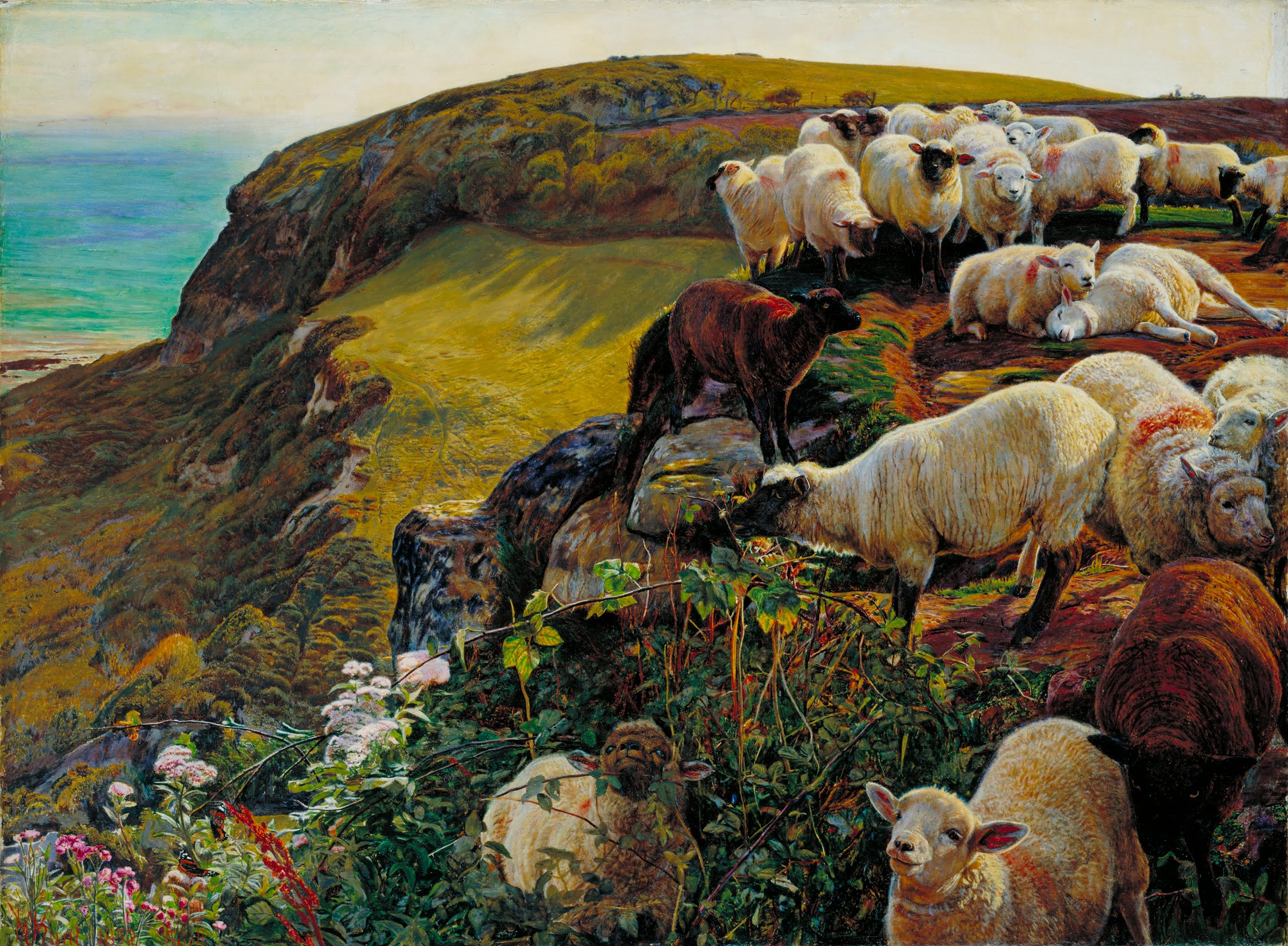
- Artist: William Holman Hunt
- Year: 1852
- Medium: Oil on canvas
- Dimensions: 76 cm × 122 cm (30 in × 48 in)
- Location: Tate Britain, London

Our English Coasts, also known as Strayed Sheep, is an oil-on-canvas painting by William Holman Hunt, completed in 1852. It has been held by the Tate Gallery since 1946, acquired through the National Art Collections Fund.

== Painter ==
William Holman Hunt was a British painter, who co-founded the Pre-Raphaelite Brotherhood (1848), along with Dante Gabriel Rossetti and John Everett Millais. The Pre-Raphaelite Brotherhood advocated a return to spirituality and sincerity of the arts, despising academic painting, which they considered a mere repetition of clichés. Despite these beliefs, the group created a number of works for institutes of higher learning in England. Under the Victorian era (1837–1901) the conservative academic aspect was represented by the Royal Academy of Arts. Among the more radical options was the movement Arts and Crafts, led by William Morris. William Holman Hunt was somewhere in the middle. Although he studied at the Royal Academy, he rejected the style imposed by its founder Sir Joshua Reynolds.

== Painting ==
After Holman Hunt's painting The Hireling Shepherd was acquired by William Broderip, this work was commissioned by Broderip's cousin, Charles Theobald Maud, as a reproduction of the sheep in the background. Maud was persuaded to accept a more adventurous composition. He worked en plein air at the location depicted between August and December 1852, despite cold and rainy weather. The painting combines features from different vantage points, with butterflies added in the studio modelled from life.

The painting depicts a flock of sheep lining the picturesque coast of Sussex. The scenic location painted rests on the cliffs at Fairlight Glen, beside Covehust Bay near Hastings, called the Lovers' Seat.

The painting is painted in many layers, with brilliant colours, as many of Hunt's paintings are painted.

It was exhibited at the Royal Academy summer exhibition in 1853 under the title Our English Coasts, but the frame bore the inscription "The Lost Sheep", and it was renamed Strayed Sheep when it was exhibited at the Exposition Universelle in Paris in 1855. It was acquired by the Tate Gallery in 1946, through the National Art Collections Fund.

On 30 July 2019, after the British Prime Minister, Boris Johnson visited Wales, cartoonist Steve Bell parodied the painting in The Guardian newspaper.
