= Miracle of the Holy Fire =

The Miracle of the Holy Fire may refer to:

- Holy Fire, an annual religious ceremony of the Greek Orthodox church in Jerusalem
- The Miracle of the Holy Fire (painting), an 1892–99 painting by William Holman Hunt depicting the ceremony
