= The Haunted Manor =

The Haunted Manor may refer to:

- The Haunted Manor (opera), an 1865 opera by Stanisław Moniuszko
- The Haunted Manor (painting), an 1849 landscape painting by William Holman Hunt
- The Haunted Manor (1916 film), a silent drama film
- The Haunted Manor (1936 film), a Polish musical film, based on the opera

== See also ==
- Phantom Manor, an attraction at Disneyland Paris
