= Report on Probability A =

1968 novel by Brian Aldiss

- New Worlds, No. 171, 1967.
- Author: Brian W. Aldiss
- Language: English
- Genre: science fiction
- Publisher: New Worlds
- Publication date: 1967
- Publication place: United Kingdom
- Media type: Science fiction magazine
- Pages: 128

Report on Probability A is a science fiction novel by British writer Brian Aldiss. The novel was completed in 1962 and published in 1967 in the British magazine New Worlds after first being rejected by publishers in the United Kingdom, France and the United States. Report on Probability A has been described as an antinovel. It is a seminal work in the British New Wave of experimental science fiction that began appearing in New Worlds following the appointment of Michael Moorcock as editor in 1964. A revised and extended version was published by Faber and Faber in 1968 and Doubleday in 1969. New Worlds described it as "perhaps [Aldiss'] most brilliant work to date".

According to Aldiss, the idea for the novel came from the Heisenberg uncertainty principle and its corollary that "observation alters what is observed". Aldiss, taking this as his starting point, "sat down to construct a fiction in which everything was observation within observation, and no ultimate reference point existed". The novel incorporates several related concepts in quantum physics, notably the many-worlds interpretation and different frames of reference. Its philosophical theme is indicated in the epigram, which quotes Goethe:

Do not, I beg you, look for anything behind phenomena. They are themselves their own lesson.

== Plot summary ==
The story is divided into three sections: "G who waits", "S the watchful" and "The house and the watchers". In New Worlds these sections are divided into fourteen chapters, with Part II beginning halfway through chapter six and ending in chapter eleven. In the Faber edition the three sections are divided into sixteen chapters, with six chapters each in Parts I and II and four chapters in Part III.

The bulk of the novel is the titular report, which describes in objective, repetitive and seemingly trivial detail the bizarre activity, taking place one overcast January day, apparently in England, around a suburban house in which a writer, Mr. Mary, lives with his wife. In the grounds of the house are various outbuildings which are occupied by three of the Marys' ex-employees: the gardener "G" is in a wooden hut, or summerhouse, some ten metres north-west of the house; Mr. Mary's former secretary "S" is in the upper room of a brick outhouse – a former stable or coach house – at the end of the back garden; and the chauffeur "C" is in a small loft above the garage a metre and a half from the south-east wall of the house. Thus the gardener (G) is in a summerhouse (S), the secretary (S) in a coach house (C) and the chauffeur (C) in a garage (G), achieving a kind of linguistic circularity.

All three men are watching the house from their various vantage points and occasionally see Mr. or Mrs. Mary entering or leaving the house or passing within view of a window. The Marys know they are being watched and are evidently upset, and there is some hostility between the men, who avoid each other. The Mary's housekeeper checks on the men from time to time and they each ask her what Mr. and Mrs. Mary are doing. Each also visits a café across the road which never has any other customers, and they eat poached haddock or drink coffee (though no one pays) and engage in stilted conversations with the proprietor Mr. Watt about a strike at a local factory. These conversations are given in the form of quoted speeches with no names ascribed. Mr. Watt is also watching the Mary's house and each man asks him what he has seen. They are particularly interested in Mr. Mary's wife, and Mr. Mary is later seen at one of the windows brandishing a gun. The atmosphere is menacing and claustrophobic, and it seems that something dreadful is about to happen.

The report itself is being compiled in another "continuum" where two characters, Domoladossa and Midlakemela, speculate on its meaning and whether the inhabitants of the world they call "Probability A" are human. Domoladossa believes that Mr. Mary's wife is the key to the mystery and later questions whether events in her world are being "interfered with by reason of their being observed" in his. He is unaware that a framed photograph of his own wife, which sits on his desk, is a portal to a third world where he is being watched by four Distinguishers on a hillside, who in turn are unaware that a robot fly is transmitting a live feed to a large screen in a building in New York City where they are being watched by a group of men, who are likewise being watched by two young men and a boy in an empty warehouse who think they have discovered a time machine. "And", reveals Aldiss, "there were watchers watching them, and they too had watchers, who also had watchers, and so on, and so on", while "Mr. Mary's wife sat at her own screen and regarded the cycle of universes as night closed in" and C lay in the loft above the garage, contemplating a picture of two snakes swallowing each other's tail like an ouroboros.

A motif added by Aldiss in the Faber edition of the novel is The Hireling Shepherd, a painting by the Pre-Raphaelite artist William Holman Hunt which is thought to have multiple interpretations and possibly a hidden meaning. There are copies of the painting in the outbuildings occupied by G, S and C, and it also exists in Domoladossa's world, where it is attributed to a "Russian-born German of British extraction" named Winkel Henri Hunt. A detail from the painting is reproduced in black and white on the dust jacket of the Faber edition, and superimposed on the reproduction is a picture of a book with the words LOW POINT X on its cover in pink block capitals. The book lies on the grass in the foreground of the painting and is one of the books on a shelf in the upper room of the outhouse occupied by S. It may also be a reference to "the pigeon known as X" which frequents the Mary's garden, since a black-and-white cat stalks the pigeon and eventually catches it. (The painting, as seen on the Faber dustjacket, is also referenced on the cover of the 1969 Sphere Books paperback edition. This depicts three bubbles, each containing the central detail of the painting, receding in perspective, as they apparently drift through thick clouds.) The Faber version of the painting with the book exists in another world where a woman known as the Wandering Virgin is in a trance-like state. She is reciting events in the worlds of G, S and C, Domoladossa, and the men in New York to a jury of ten men, whose members include the Suppressor of the Archives, the Impaler of Distortions, the Impersonator of Sorrows, the Image Motivator and the Squire of Reason. The book is thought to indicate the mental state of the girl in the painting, but the Virgin's recital becomes confused and the jury cannot decide whether the worlds she is describing are real or imaginary. The novel ends with the suggestion that the painting is a window on another world where time stands still. However, there is also a world in which both versions of the painting exist – in Manchester Art Gallery and on Faber's dust jacket – and readers of the novel who are, in effect, 'watching the watchers' may be left with the feeling that perhaps they too are being watched in other parallel universes.

== Reception ==
Paul Di Filippo characterized it as "an infinite regress of cosmic voyeurs [that] seems to center around an enigmatic painting, as the French nouveau roman movement invades science fiction". Joanna Russ wrote that "Report is a false-narrative, a book full of narrative cues that raise expectations only to thwart them." She concluded that she admired "everything about the novel except its length. Matter organized in the lyrical, not the narrative, mode cannot be sustained for this long. Report would have made a brilliant novelette, but as a novel it is sheer self-indulgence." James Nicoll has said that to call it a 'novel' might raise inappropriate expectations", and suggests instead "novel-length narrative", finding it to be "a literary experiment in recursion and rejection of conventional plot" – one whose "characters are not especially compelling. Nor is there really a plot as such. Obsessively detailed descriptions aside, the prose is workmanlike. However, characters and plot really aren’t the point."
