= The Scapegoat (painting) =

Painting by William Holman Hunt

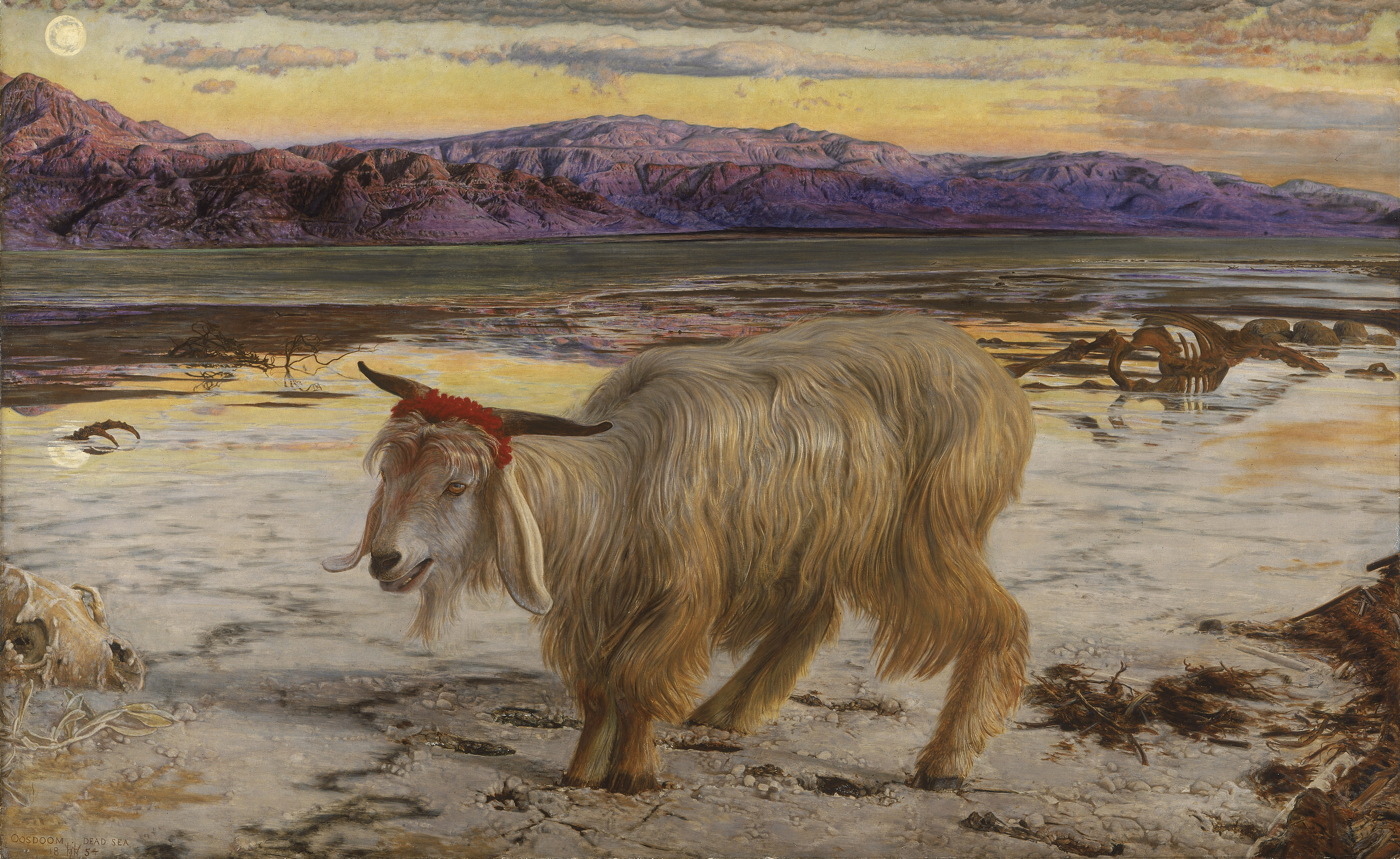
- Artist: William Holman Hunt
- Year: 1854–1856
- Medium: Oil on canvas
- Dimensions: 86 cm × 140 cm (34 in × 55 in)
- Location: Lady Lever Art Gallery, Port Sunlight

The Scapegoat
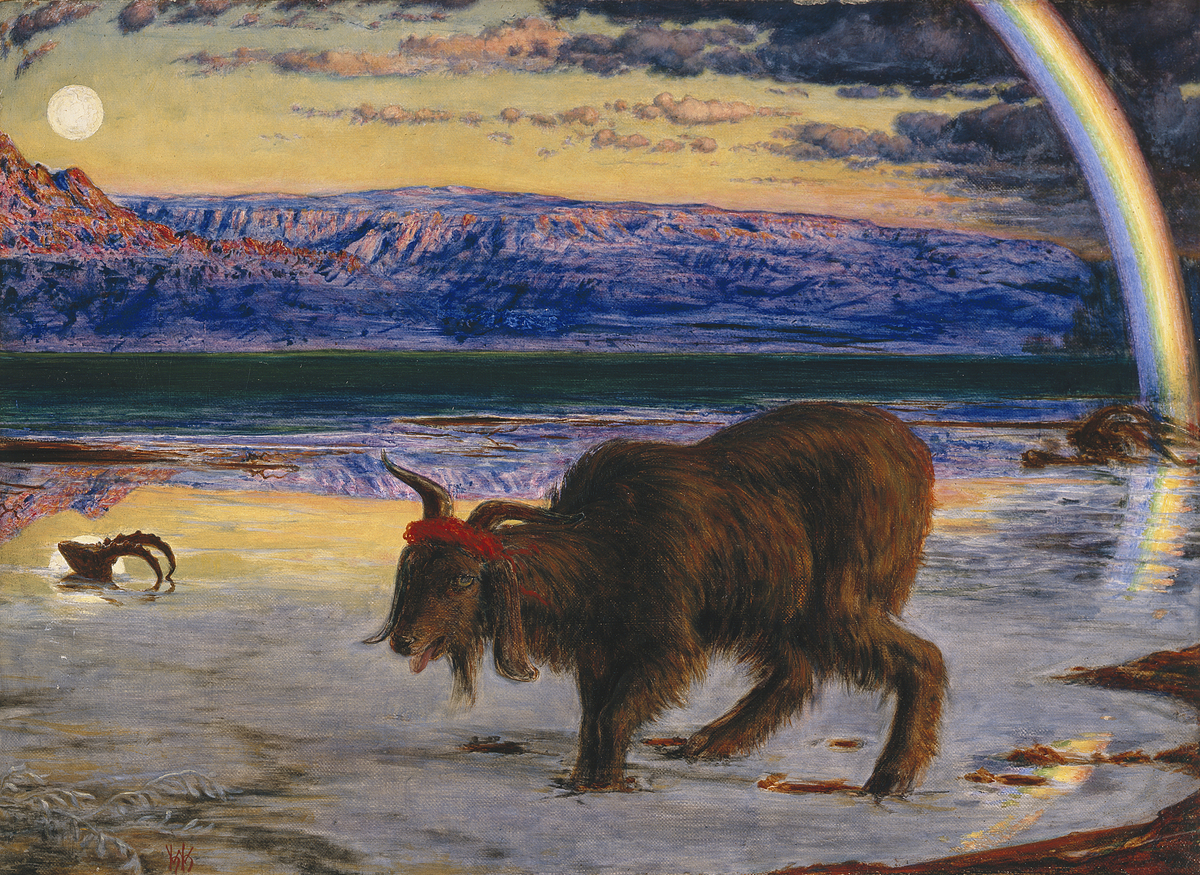
- Artist: William Holman Hunt
- Year: 1854–55
- Medium: Oil on canvas
- Dimensions: 33.7 cm × 45.9 cm (13.3 in × 18.1 in)
- Location: Manchester Art Gallery, Manchester

The Scapegoat (1854–1856) is a painting by William Holman Hunt which depicts the "scapegoat" described in the Book of Leviticus. On the Day of Atonement, a goat would have its horns wrapped with a red cloth – representing the sins of the community – and be driven off.

Hunt started painting on the shore of the Dead Sea, and continued it in his studio in London. The work exists in two versions, a small version in brighter colours with a dark-haired goat and a rainbow, in Manchester Art Gallery, and a larger version in more muted tones with a light-haired goat in the Lady Lever Art Gallery in Port Sunlight. Both were created over the same period, with the smaller Manchester version being described as "preliminary" to the larger Lady Lever version, which was the one exhibited.

== History ==
In the Royal Academy exhibition catalogue Hunt wrote that "the scene was painted at Sodom, on the margin of the salt-encrusted shallows of the Dead Sea. The mountains beyond are those of Edom." He painted most of the work on location in 1854, but completed the work in London in the following year, adding some touches in 1856 before its exhibition at the academy.

The painting was the only major work completed by Hunt during his first trip to the Holy Land, to which he had travelled after a crisis of religious faith. Hunt intended to experience the actual locations of the Biblical narratives as a means to confront the relationship between faith and truth. While in Jerusalem, Hunt had met Henry Wentworth Monk, a millenarian prophet who had distinctive theories about the meaning of the scapegoat and the proximity of the Last Judgement. Monk was particularly preoccupied with Christian Zionism.

Hunt chose a subject derived from the Torah as part of a project to convert Jews to Christianity. He believed that Judaic views of the scapegoat were consistent with the Christian conception of the Messiah as a suffering figure. He wrote to his friend Millais, "I am sanguine that [the Scapegoat] may be a means of leading any reflecting Jew to see a reference to the Messiah as he was, and not as they understand, a temporal King."

The Book of Leviticus describes a "scapegoat" which must be ritually expelled from the flocks of the Israelite tribes as part of a sacrificial ritual of cleansing. In line with traditional Christian theology, Hunt believed that the scapegoat was a prototype for the redemptive sacrifice of Jesus, and that the goat represented that aspect of the Messiah described in Isaiah as a "suffering servant" of God. Hunt had the picture framed with the quotations "Surely he hath borne our Griefs and carried our Sorrows; Yet we did esteem him stricken, smitten of GOD and afflicted." (Isaiah 53:4) and "And the Goat shall bear upon him all their iniquities unto a Land not inhabited." (Leviticus 16:22)

== Critical reception ==
The reaction to the painting was not as Hunt expected. In his autobiography Pre-Raphaelitism and the Pre-Raphaelite Brotherhood, Hunt relates the first reaction to the painting by art dealer Ernest Gambart:

Gambart, the picture-dealer, was ever shrewd and entertaining. He came in his turn to my studio, and I led him to The Scapegoat. "What do you call that?"
"The Scapegoat."
"Yes; but what is it doing?"
"You will understand by the title, Le bouc expiatoire."
"But why expiatoire?" he asked.
"Well, there is a book called the Bible, which gives an account of the animal. You will remember."
"No," he replied, "I never heard of it."
"Ah, I forgot, the book is not known in France, but English people read it more or less," I said, "and they would all understand the story of the beast being driven into the wilderness."
"You are mistaken. No one would know anything about it, and if I bought the picture it would be left on my hands. Now, we will see," replied the dealer. "My wife is an English lady, there is a friend of hers, an English girl, in the carriage with her, we will ask them up, you shall tell them the title; we will see. Do not say more."
The ladies were conducted into the room. "Oh how pretty! what is it?" they asked.
"It is The Scapegoat." I said.
There was a pause. "Oh yes," they commented to one another, "it is a peculiar goat, you can see by the ears, they droop so."
The dealer then, nodding with a smile towards me, said to them, "It is in the wilderness."
The ladies: "Is that the wilderness now? Are you intending to introduce any others of the flock?" And so the dealer was proved to be right, and I had over-counted on the picture's intelligibility.

— William Holman Hunt, loc cit.

Dante Gabriel Rossetti, in a letter to William Allingham in 1856, called the painting "a grand thing, but not for the public". Ford Madox Brown wrote in his diary: "Hunt's Scapegoat requires to be seen to be believed in. Only then can it be understood how, by the might of genius, out of an old goat, and some saline encrustations, can be made one of the most tragic and impressive works in the annals of art." Ernest Gambart, as related by Hunt, was less enthusiastic, and was later to remark: "I wanted a nice religious picture and he painted me a great goat." The Art Journal in 1860, at the time of the exhibition of Hunt's later work The Finding of the Saviour in the Temple, was to characterise the painting as "having disappointed even his warmest admirers".

At the time of the exhibition of The Scapegoat itself, in 1856, The Art Journal questioned Hunt's eye for colour in the painting, casting doubt that the mountains of Edom, seen in the background, really were in actual appearance as painted – which Matthew Dennison, writing in The Spectator in 2008 described the Manchester version as "Day-Glo striations of lilac, crimson and egg-yolk yellow". Dennison suggests the possibility that Hunt was painting the scene from memory, when he was finishing the painting in London after he had returned from his trip to the Dead Sea, and mis-remembered it. Evolutionary biologist W. D. Hamilton, who saw the painting as a boy and was deeply impressed by the "sci-fi book cover" intensity of it, wrote after visiting Israel that "now on the shores of the Dead Sea I knew that I saw exactly the background I had remembered...if anything more exceptional, more other-worldly, than the painting had made them." Hunt's own description of the landscape that he painted is that "never was so extraordinary a scene of beautifully arranged horrible wilderness. It is black, full of asphalte scum and in the hand slimy, and smarting as a sting – No one can stand and say that it is not accursed of God." Art critic Peter Fuller, in 1989, described the landscape of the painting as "a terrible image [...] of the world as a god-forsaken wasteland, a heap of broken images where the sun beats".
