= The Finding of the Saviour in the Temple =

Painting by William Holman Hunt

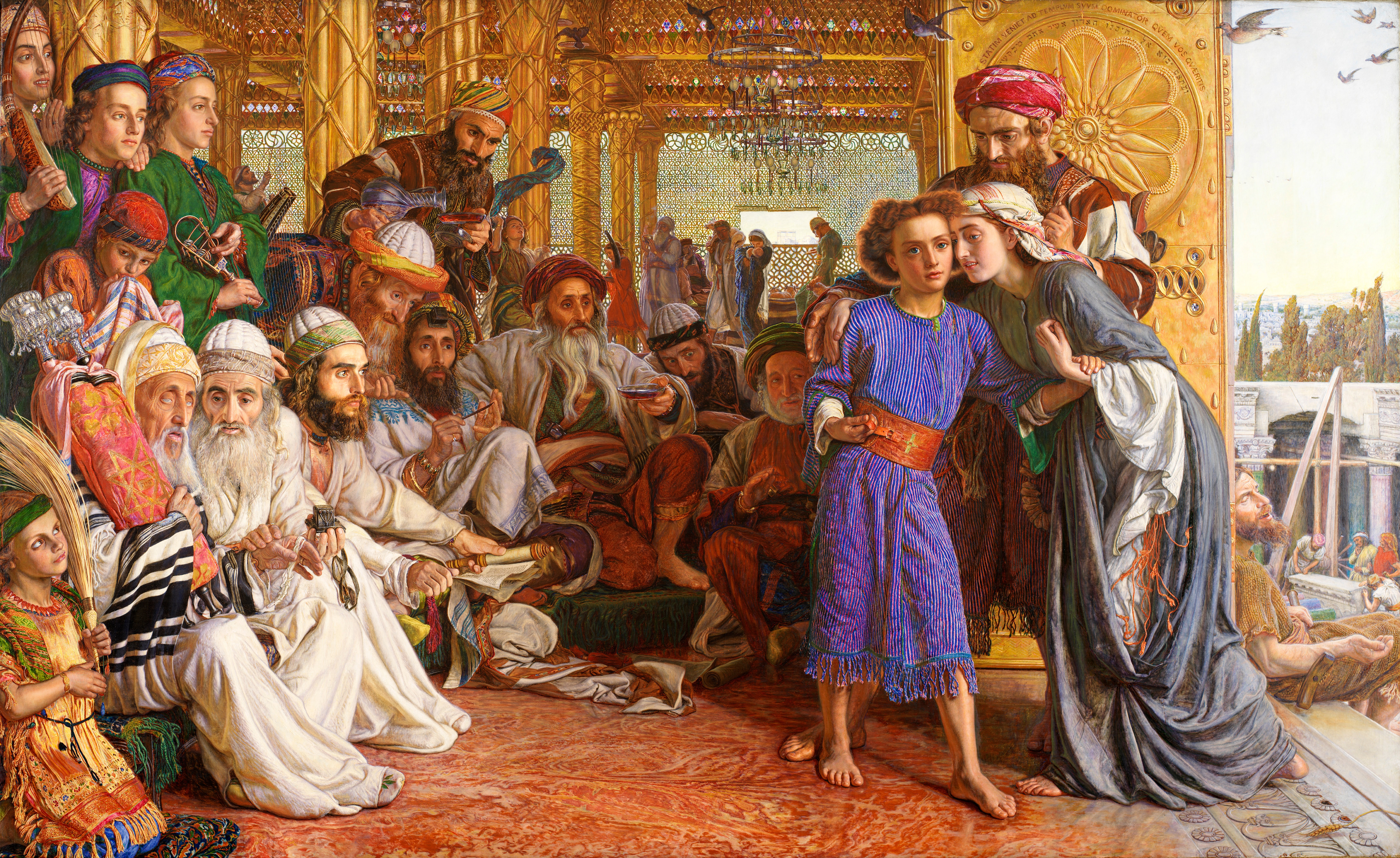
- Artist: William Holman Hunt
- Year: 1860
- Medium: Oil on canvas
- Dimensions: 141.0 cm × 85.7 cm (55 1/2 in × 33 3/4 in)
- Location: Birmingham Museum and Art Gallery; Birmingham

The Finding of the Saviour in the Temple (1854–1860) is a painting by the English artist William Holman Hunt intended as an ethnographically accurate version of the subject traditionally known as "Christ Among the Doctors", an illustration of the child Jesus debating the interpretation of the scripture with learned rabbis. The passage illustrated is from the Gospel of Luke, 2:41, which states:

Every year his parents went to Jerusalem for the Feast of the Passover. When he was twelve years old, they went up to the Feast, according to the custom. After the Feast was over, while his parents were returning home, the boy Jesus stayed behind in Jerusalem, but they were unaware of it. Thinking he was in their company, they traveled on for a day. Then they began looking for him among their relatives and friends. When they did not find him, they went back to Jerusalem to look for him. After three days they found him in the temple courts, sitting among the teachers, listening to them and asking them questions. Everyone who heard him was amazed at his understanding and his answers. When his parents saw him, they were astonished. His mother said to him, "Son, why have you treated us like this? Your father and I have been anxiously searching for you." "Why were you searching for me?" he asked. "Didn't you know I had to be in my Father's house?" But they did not understand what he was saying to them.

Hunt depicts the moment at which Mary and Joseph find Jesus, while the rabbis in the temple are reacting in various contrasting ways to his discourse, some intrigued, others angry or dismissive. This depiction of contrasting reactions is part of the tradition of the subject, as evidenced in Albrecht Dürer's much earlier version. Hunt would also have known Bernardino Luini's version of the subject in the National Gallery. At the time this was ascribed to Leonardo da Vinci.

== Background ==
Obsessed with the idea of revitalising religious art by emphasising ethnographical accuracy combined with detailed Biblical symbolism, Hunt had travelled to the Middle East to create the picture, using local people as models and studying ancient Judaic customs and rituals. Progress on the painting was delayed by difficulties with models, and eventually Hunt postponed it to work on another project, The Scapegoat. He eventually completed it in 1860, back in England. (Note: The model for the figure of Mary may be Annie Miller.) His friend Frederic George Stephens wrote a pamphlet containing a detailed explanation of the content and the characters. It was then shown in a series of popular travelling exhibitions at which visitors could buy the pamphlet and subscribe to an engraved reproduction. These were organised by the dealer Ernest Gambart, and proved a great financial success.

Hunt sold the painting with copyright to the art dealer Ernest Gambart for the huge sum of 5,500 guineas.

Thomas Carlyle gave his thoughts in a letter:

The Christ is an exquisite mixture of a god and a peasant lad. His mother too is very fine; but I thot she shd have been a little angry withal (at having got such a fright from her careless son) instead of merely rapturous over him as she might be over a baby saved from the wolf. There were other criticisms:-but I have not seen such a Picture, for fidelity of execution, for exquisite finish, and limner and other talent, by any modern man.
