= Self-Portrait with Pipe (Courbet) =

Painting by Gustave Courbet

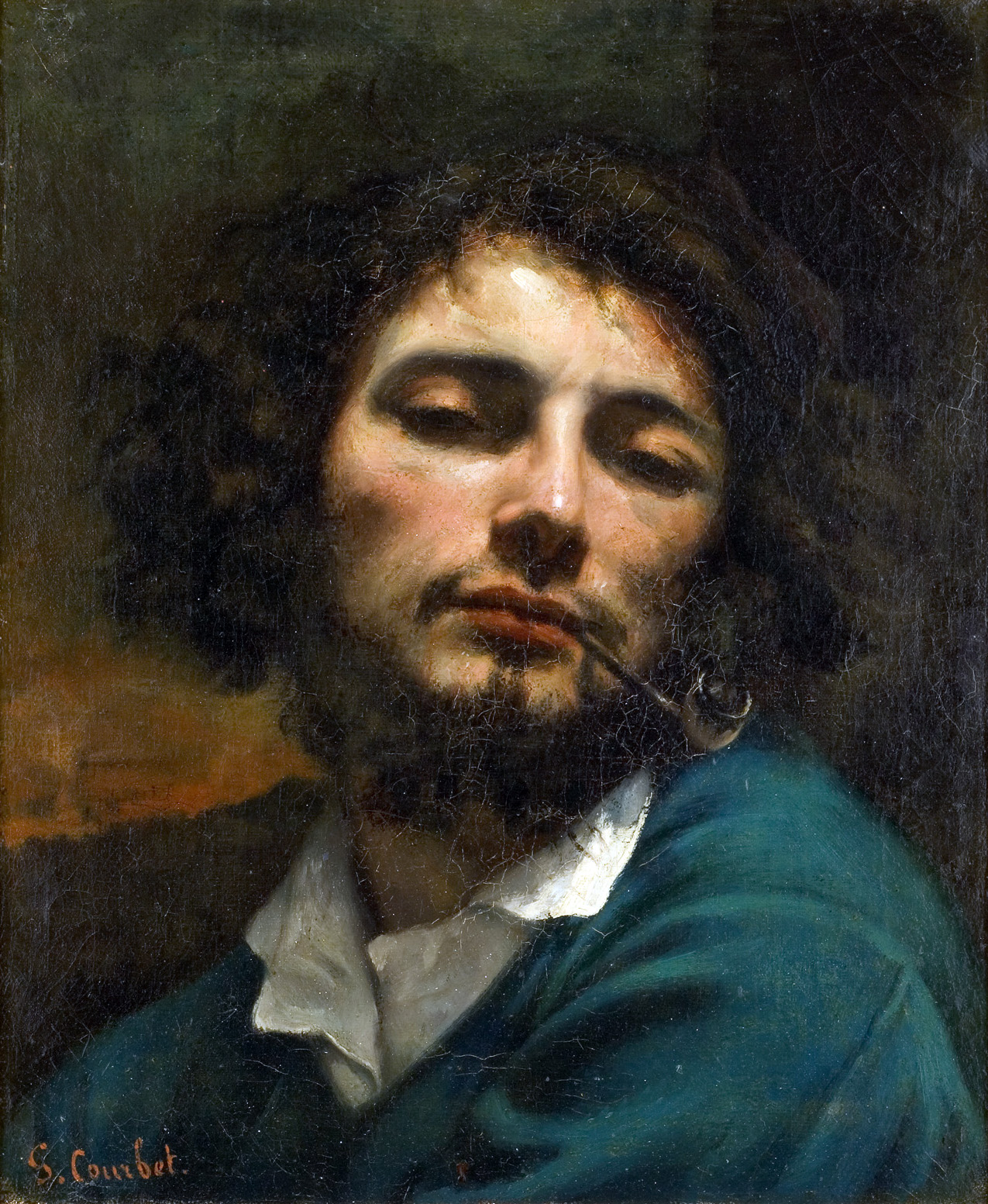
- Artist: Gustave Courbet
- Year: 1849
- Type: Oil on canvas, portrait painting
- Dimensions: 45.8 cm × 37.8 cm (18.0 in × 14.9 in)
- Location: Musée Fabre, Montpellier

Self-Portrait with Pipe is an 1849 portrait painting by the French artist Gustave Courbet. A self-portrait, it shows him with a workman's smock with a small pipe in his mouth. He captures the air of a Romantic bohemian he tried to cultivate in his younger years.

Courbet was a leading figure in the Realist movement of the mid-nineteenth century. The self-portrait was displayed at the Salon of 1850 at the Palais-Royal in Paris where his A Burial at Ornans and The Stone Breakers attracted widespread notice. It is now in the Musée Fabre in Montpellier, having been donated to the collection by Alfred Bruyas in 1868.

== Bibliography ==
- Eitner, Lorenz. An Outline Of 19th Century European Painting: From David Through Cezanne. Routledge, 2021.
- Hecker, Sharon. A Moment's Monument: Medardo Rosso and the International Origins of Modern Sculpture. University of California Press, 2017.
