= The Hireling Shepherd =

Painting by William Holman Hunt

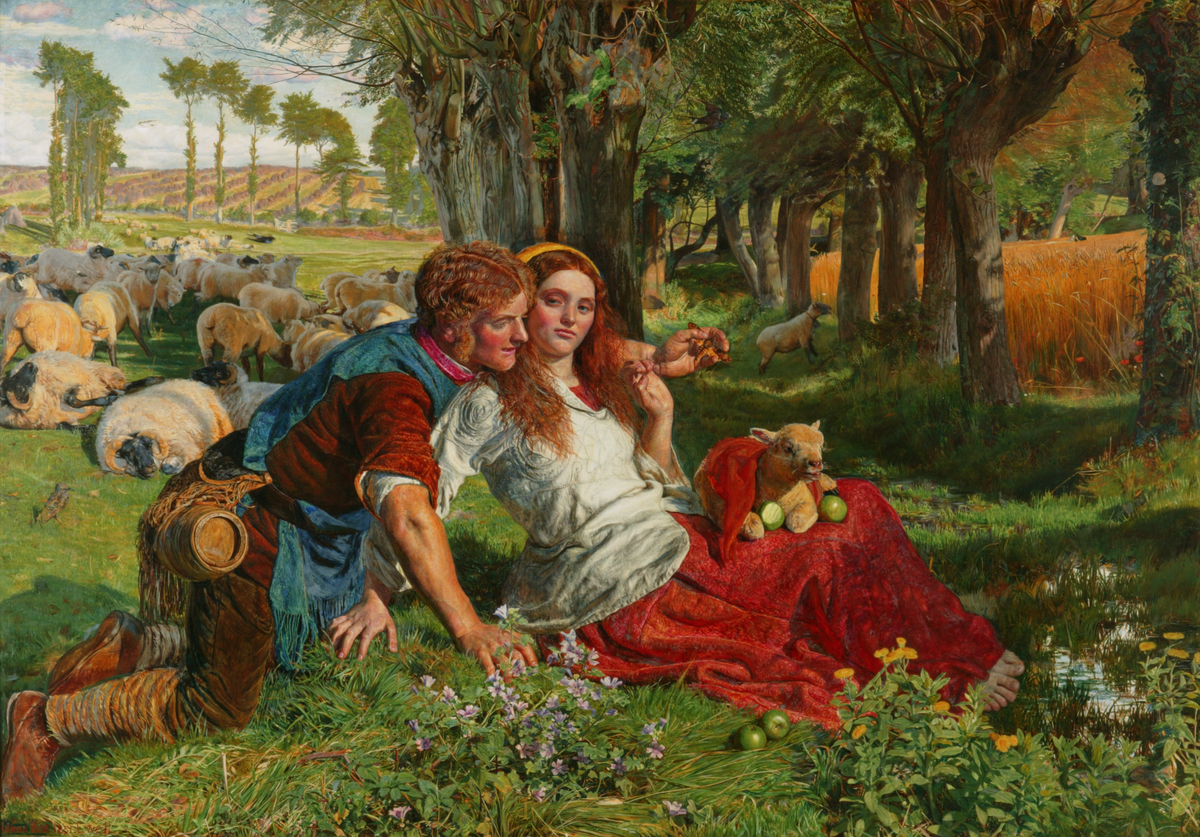
- Artist: William Holman Hunt
- Year: 1851
- Medium: Oil on canvas
- Dimensions: 76.4 cm × 109.5 cm (30 1/16 in × 43 1/8 in)
- Location: Manchester Art Gallery, Manchester

The Hireling Shepherd (1851) is a painting by the Pre-Raphaelite artist William Holman Hunt. It represents a shepherd neglecting his flock in favour of an attractive country girl to whom he shows a death's-head hawkmoth. The meaning of the image has been much debated.

== Composition ==
Hunt painted the picture when he was living and working in close collaboration with John Everett Millais, who was painting Ophelia at the same time near the Hogsmill River near Ewell, Surrey. Both paintings depict English rural scenes, the innocence of which is disturbed by subtle but profoundly threatening violations of natural harmony. In Hunt's painting, the shepherd ignores his flock of sheep, who wander over a ditch into a wheat field. This violation of boundaries is paralleled by the shepherd's physical intrusions into the personal space of the young woman, who responds in an ambiguous way that might be interpreted as complicity or as a knowing scepticism. As he shows her the moth, he places his arm round her shoulder.

Hunt used a local country girl Emma Watkins as a model. She was known as "the Coptic" by the Pre-Raphaelite Brotherhood because of her exotic features. Watkins travelled to London to model for Hunt to complete the picture, but returned home after she failed to establish herself independently as a model. The model for the male figure is not known, but was probably a professional.

When it was first displayed in the Royal Academy, it was accompanied by a quotation from King Lear:

Sleepest or wakest thou, jolly shepherd?
Thy sheep be in the corn;
And for one blast of thy minikin mouth,
Thy sheep shall take no harm.

== Interpretations ==
After it was exhibited, Hunt's enemies condemned the painting for its vulgarity, objecting to its portrayal of red-faced and sexually uninhibited country people. The Illustrated London News objected to the "fiery red skin" and "wiry hair" of Hunt’s peasants (22 May 1852, p. 407). The Athenaeum was particularly offended by these "rustics of the coarsest breed...flushed and rubicund" from too much cider. It insisted that "romp and rubicundity of this pair contrast with the pallor and pathos of Mr Millais’s picture [Ophelia]." (22 May 1852, pp. 581–583)

His supporters insisted that the painting was an unvarnished image of social fact. Hunt himself, however, hinted that he had a hidden meaning in mind, a claim he elaborated upon in a letter when the painting was acquired by Manchester Art Gallery. Hunt asserted that he intended the couple to symbolise the pointless theological debates which occupied Christian churchmen while their "flock" went astray due to a lack of proper moral guidance. This would make the title a Biblical allusion; in the story of the Good Shepherd (in the King James Version), the Good Shepherd is explicitly contrasted with a hireling shepherd, who has no care for the sheep [John 10:11–15].

== Literary significance ==
In 1859 Robert Barnabas Brough published a short story entitled "Calmuck" in Charles Dickens' magazine Household Words. It was a thinly disguised account of Hunt's experience painting the picture and of his relations with his model Emma Watkins. Some of Hunt's relatives were shocked by the apparent implication that Watkins had come to London to be with Hunt. Hunt wrote an outraged letter to Dickens, who claimed to be unaware that the story was based on real events.

Brian Aldiss used the painting as a leitmotif in his 1968 novel Report on Probability A.

== See also ==
- 100 Great Paintings, 1980 BBC series
