= The Miracle of the Holy Fire (painting) =

Painting by William Holman Hunt

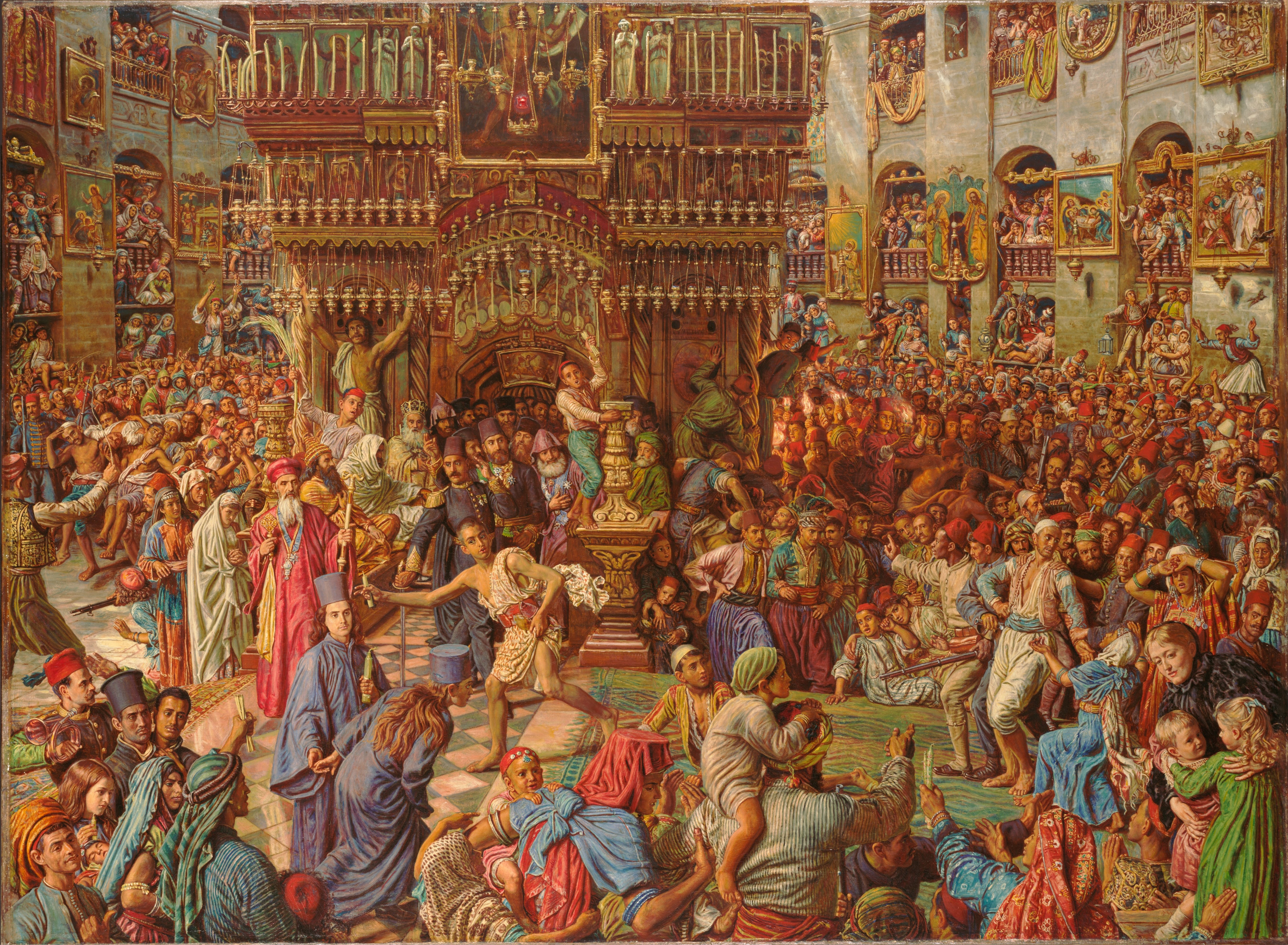
- Artist: William Holman Hunt
- Year: 1892–1899
- Medium: Oil on canvas
- Dimensions: 92 cm × 125.7 cm (36 in × 49.5 in)
- Location: Fogg Art Museum; Cambridge, Massachusetts

The Miracle of the Holy Fire (1892–1899) is an oil painting on canvas by the English artist William Holman Hunt which depicts the Greek Orthodox rite of the Holy Fire in the Church of the Holy Sepulchre Jerusalem. Hunt believed the fire to be a pious fraud which brought Christianity into disrepute. He intended the painting to be a satire in the manner of William Hogarth. Hunt published an elaborate keyplate explaining the identity of the various characters depicted.

It is now in the Fogg Art Museum, Cambridge, Massachusetts.

== Subject ==
The miracle of the Holy Fire is an annual event in which the patriarch of the Greek Orthodox church in Jerusalem enters the shrine of the Holy Sepulchre with an unlit lamp and emerges with it lit. The ceremony begins at noon when the Orthodox Patriarch of Jerusalem or another Orthodox Archbishop recites a specific prayer. The congregants will then chant "Lord, have mercy" (Kyrie eleison in Greek) until the Holy Fire "descends" on a lamp of olive oil held by the patriarch while he is alone in the tomb chamber. The patriarch will then reveal himself from the tomb chamber and recite some prayers and light either 33 or 12 candles and distribute them to the congregants.

Hunt depicts the moment at which the kindled fire is released from the chamber and passed from candle to candle. Lighted candles can be seen emerging from the shrine in the background at the right. Hunt does not concentrate on the event itself, but rather on the social and ethnographic context in which it occurs.

== Meaning ==
Along with other Protestants and Catholics, Hunt had no doubt that the fire was not a miracle, so he concentrates on what he considered to be the fanatical and grotesque responses of the participants. He also believed that the interior of the church was the epitome of bad taste, writing that it was "crammed full of trumpery pictures of old Saints, and decorated throughout in that bad taste which Roman Catholics have to themselves in Europe but which here the modern Greeks share with them."

Hunt depicted the various competing religious groups along with the different races and ethnicities of the region. At the far right a woman who represents Protestant English attitudes hurries to remove her children from the scene as the crowd becomes increasingly excited. Their Greek Orthodox nursemaid in contrast, responds enthusiastically, reaching her candle into the crowd. A number of individuals adopt poses that are designed to mimic the death and resurrection of Jesus. In the background at the far left a figure mimicking Jesus dead is carried by others adopting exaggerated gestures of mourning. In the centre a man places himself against the shrine repeating the gesture of paintings depicting Jesus's resurrection.

As the crowd becomes unruly, the soldiers representing the occupying forces of the Ottoman Empire attempt to control the more riotous elements. At the centre of the ceremony is the Islamic ruler of the city. Bim Pasha, his second in command, leans on his sword, representing order amid disorder.
