= William Holman Hunt =

Pre-Raphaelite English artist (1827–1910)

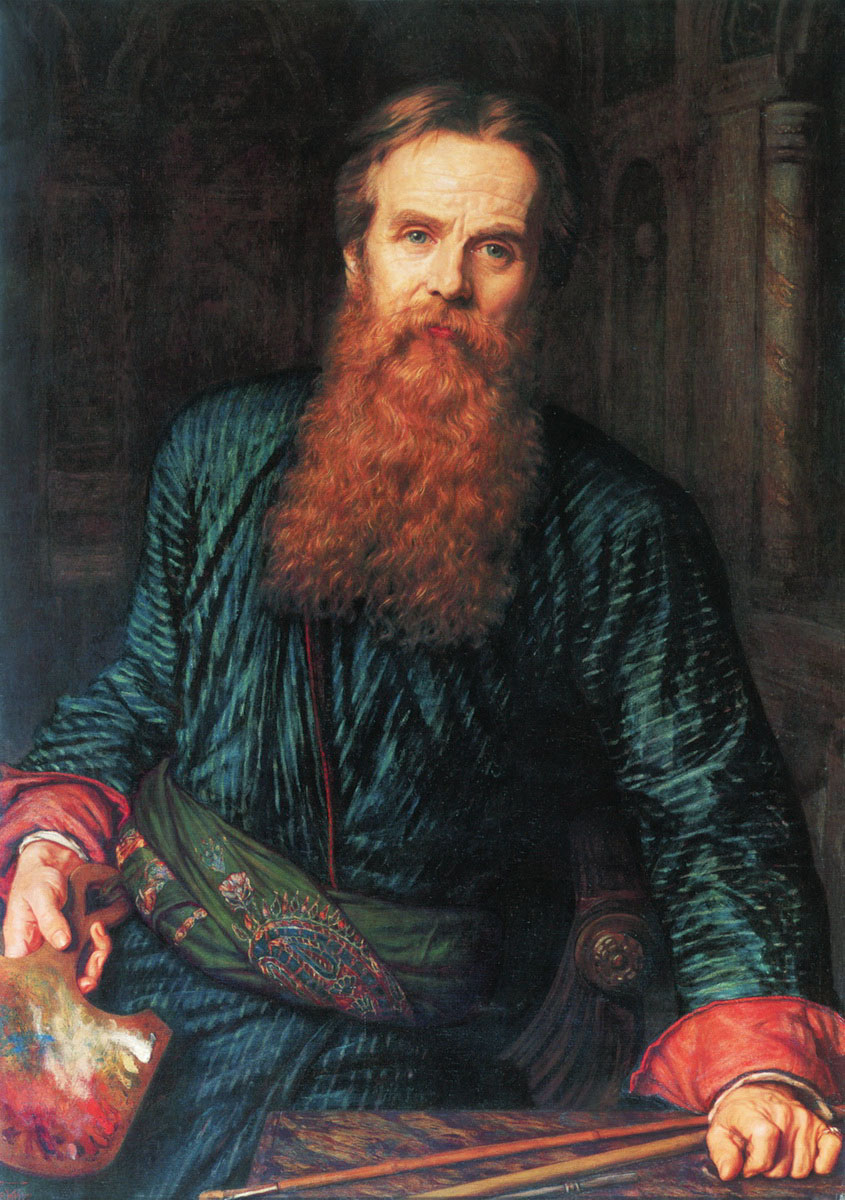
- Self-portrait, 1867, Galleria degli Uffizi, Florence
- Born: William Hobman Hunt; 2 April 1827; Cheapside, London, England
- Died: 7 September 1910 (aged 83); London, England
- Occupation: Painter
- Movement: Pre-Raphaelite Brotherhood; Orientalism
- Spouses: Fanny Waugh; Edith Waugh

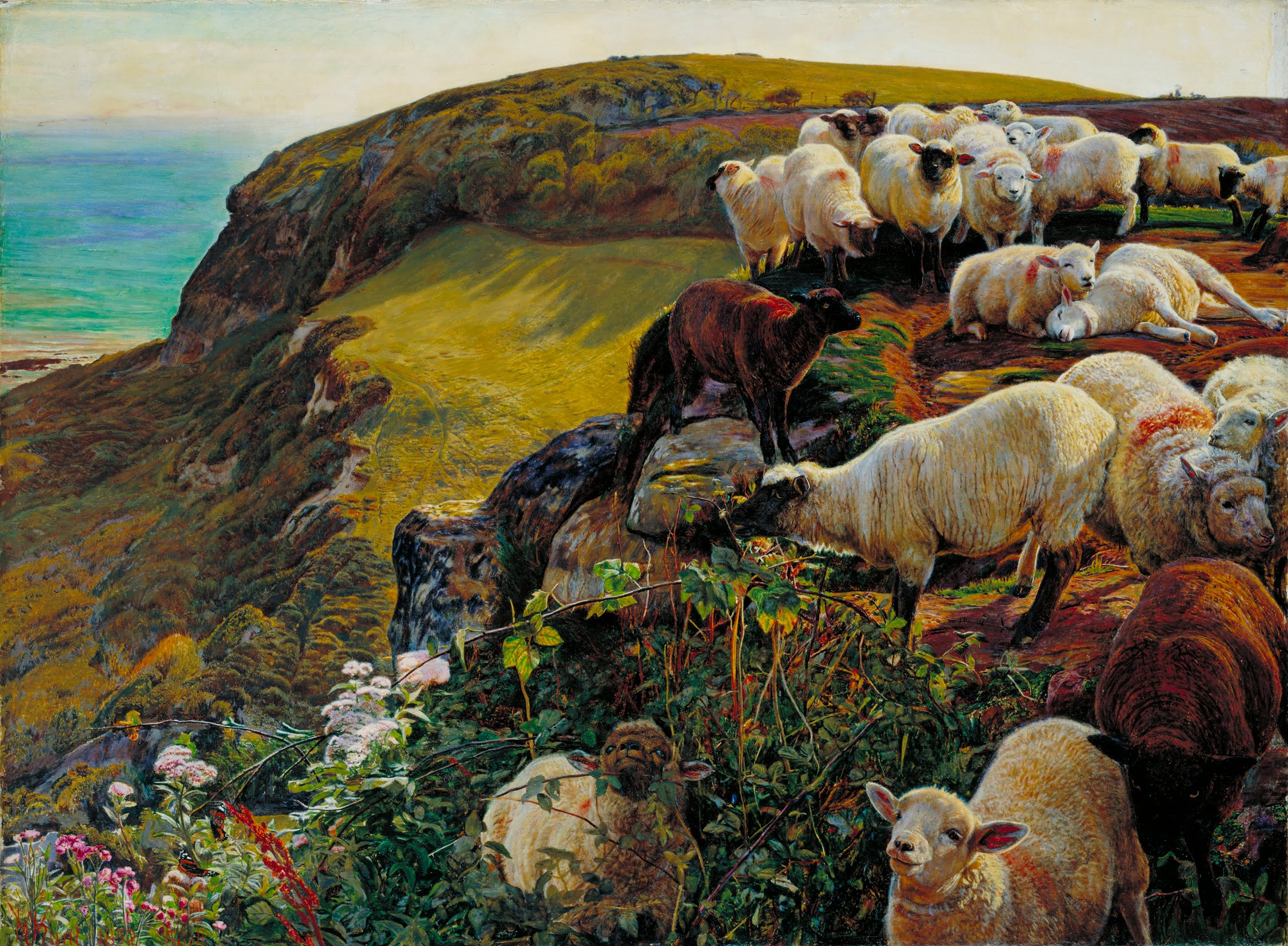
Our English Coasts, 1852 ('Strayed Sheep')

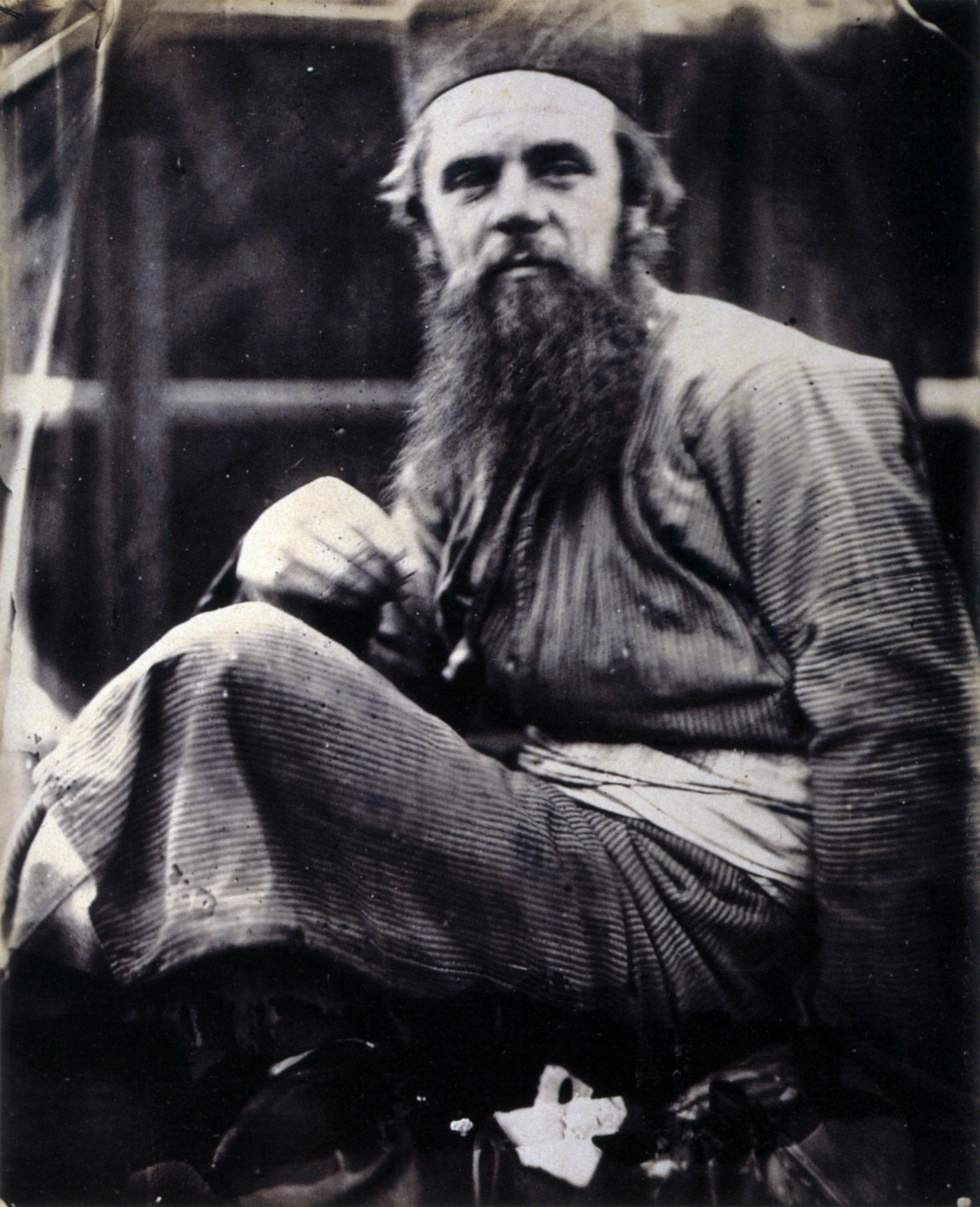
Hunt in his eastern dress, photo by Julia Margaret Cameron

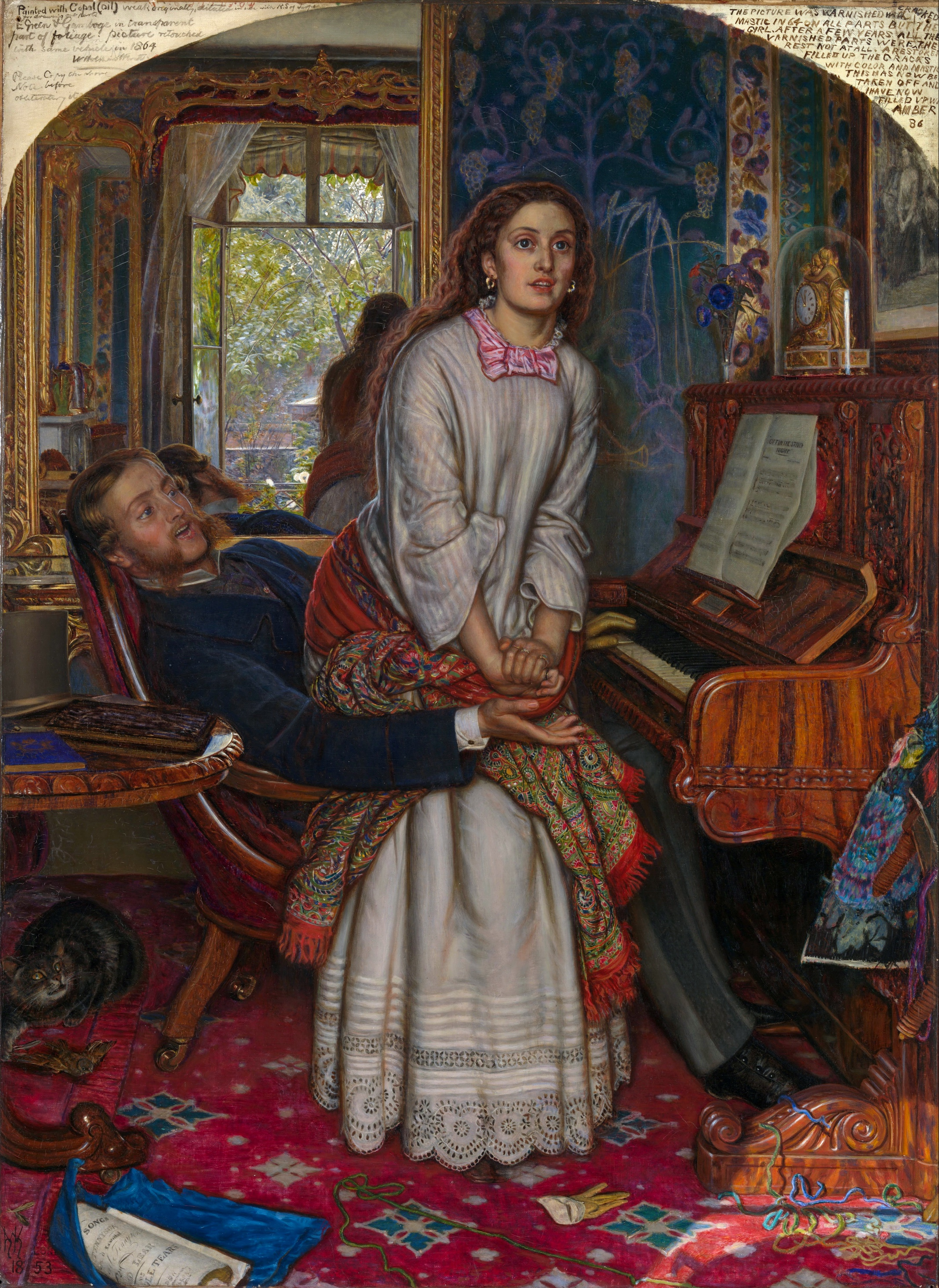
The Awakening Conscience (1853)

William Holman Hunt (2 April 1827 – 7 September 1910) was an English painter and one of the founders of the Pre-Raphaelite Brotherhood. His paintings were notable for their great attention to detail, vivid colour, and elaborate symbolism. These features were influenced by the writings of John Ruskin and Thomas Carlyle, according to whom the world itself should be read as a system of visual signs. For Hunt, it was the duty of the artist to reveal the correspondence between sign and fact. Of all the members of the Pre-Raphaelite Brotherhood, Hunt remained most true to their ideals throughout his career. He was always keen to maximise the popular appeal and public visibility of his works.

== Biography ==
William Hobman Hunt was born in Cheapside, City of London, to warehouse manager William Hunt (1800–1856) and Sarah (c. 1798–1884), daughter of William Hobman, of Rotherhithe. Hunt adopted the name "Holman" instead of "Hobman" when he discovered that a clerk had misspelled the name that way after his baptism at the Anglican church of Saint Mary the Virgin, Ewell. The Hobman family was wealthy, and it was thought that Sarah had made an unequal marriage. After eventually entering the Royal Academy art schools, having initially been rejected, Hunt rebelled against the influence of its founder Sir Joshua Reynolds. He formed the Pre-Raphaelite movement in 1848, after meeting the poet and artist Dante Gabriel Rossetti. Along with John Everett Millais they sought to revitalise art by emphasising the detailed observation of the natural world in a spirit of quasi-religious devotion to truth. This religious approach was influenced by the spiritual qualities of medieval art, in opposition to the alleged rationalism of the Renaissance embodied by Raphael. He had many pupils, including Robert Braithwaite Martineau.

Hunt married twice. After a failed engagement to his model Annie Miller, in 1861, he married Fanny Waugh, who later modelled for the figure of Isabella. When, at the end of 1866, she died in childbirth in Italy, he sculpted her tomb at Fiesole, having it brought down to the English Cemetery in Florence, beside the tomb of Elizabeth Barrett Browning. He had a close connection with St. Mark's Church in Florence, and paid for the communion chalice inscribed in memory of his wife. His second wife, Edith, was Fanny's youngest sister. At the time it was illegal in Great Britain to marry one's deceased wife's sister, so the two of them travelled abroad and married at Neuchâtel (in francophone Switzerland) in November 1875. This led to a grave conflict with other family members, notably his former Pre-Raphaelite colleague Thomas Woolner, who had once been in love with Fanny and had married the middle sister, Alice Waugh.

Hunt's works were not initially successful, and were widely attacked in the art press for their alleged clumsiness and ugliness. He achieved some early note for his intensely naturalistic scenes of modern rural and urban life, such as The Hireling Shepherd and The Awakening Conscience. However, it was for his religious paintings that he became famous, initially The Light of the World (1851–1853), now in the chapel at Keble College, Oxford, England; a later version (1900) toured the world and now has its home in St Paul's Cathedral, London. Hunt worked at his home in Prospect Place (now Cheyne Walk), Chelsea, London.

In the mid-1850s Hunt travelled to the Holy Land in search of accurate topographical and ethnographical material for further religious works, and to employ his "powers to make more tangible Jesus Christ's history and teaching"; there he painted The Scapegoat, The Finding of the Saviour in the Temple, and The Shadow of Death, along with many landscapes of the region. Hunt also painted many works based on poems, such as Isabella and The Lady of Shalott. He eventually built his own house in Jerusalem.

He eventually had to abandon painting because failing eyesight meant that he could not achieve the quality that he wanted. His last major works, including a large version of The Light of the World hanging in St Paul's Cathedral, London, were completed with the help of his assistant, Edward Robert Hughes.

Hunt lived and had a studio at 18 Melbury Road in Holland Park, West London, from 1903 until his death. He died on 7 September 1910 and was buried at St Paul's Cathedral in London.

== Awards and commemoration ==
Hunt published an autobiography in 1905. Many of his late writings are attempts to control the interpretation of his work. That year, he was appointed to the Order of Merit by King Edward VII. At the end of his life, he lived in Sonning-on-Thames. 18 Melbury Road has a blue plaque commemorating Hunt, added in 1923.

Hunt's personal life was the subject of Diana Holman-Hunt's book My Grandfather, his Life and Loves.

The Pre-Raphaelite Brotherhood was depicted in two BBC period dramas. The first, The Love School, in 1975, starred Bernard Lloyd as Hunt. The second was Desperate Romantics, in which Hunt is played by Rafe Spall.

Facing Mar Elias Monastery is a stone bench erected by the wife of the painter, who painted some of his major works at this spot. The bench is inscribed with biblical verses in Hebrew, Greek, Arabic and English.

== Partial list of works ==
- Christ and the Two Marys (1847 and 1897)
- Rienzi vowing to obtain justice for the death of his young brother, slain in a skirmish between the Colonna and the Orsini factions (1849)
- A Converted British Family Sheltering a Christian Missionary from the Persecution of the Druids (1850)
- The Hireling Shepherd (1851)
- Valentine Rescuing Sylvia from Proteus (1851)
- Our English Coasts ('Strayed Sheep') (1852)
- The Awakening Conscience (1853)
- Portrait of Dante Gabriel Rossetti at 22 Years of Age (1853)
- The Light of the World (1854)
- The Lantern Maker's Courtship, A Street Scene in Cairo (1854–56)
- The Scapegoat (1856)
- The Finding of the Saviour in the Temple (1854–1860)
- Nazareth (1861)
- London Bridge on the Night of the Marriage of the Prince and Princess of Wales (1864)
- Portrait of Fanny Holman Hunt (1866–67)
- Self portrait (1867)
- Isabella and the Pot of Basil (1868)
- The Birthday (1868)
- The Shadow of Death (1873)
- Amaryllis (1884)
- May Morning on Magdalen Tower (1890)
- The Importunate Neighbour (1895)
- The Miracle of the Holy Fire (1899)
- The Triumph of the Innocents (1876–87) which is displayed at the Walker Art Gallery, Liverpool.
- The Lady of Shalott (c. 1890-1905)

== Gallery ==
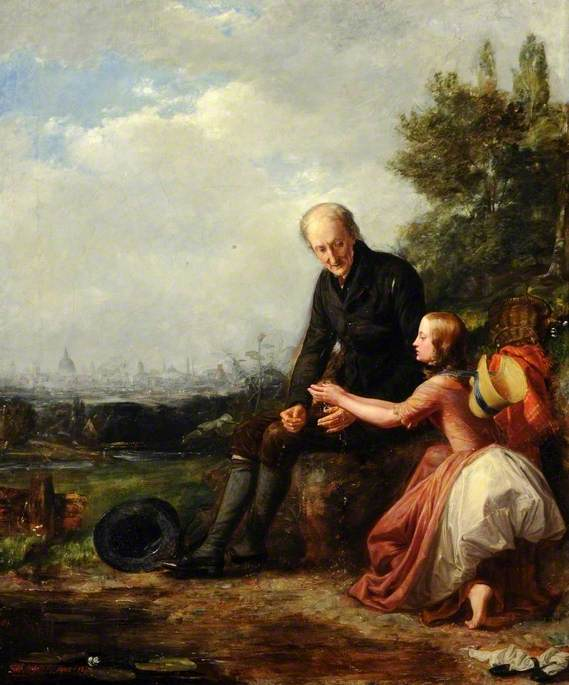
Little Nell and Her Grandfather (1845)

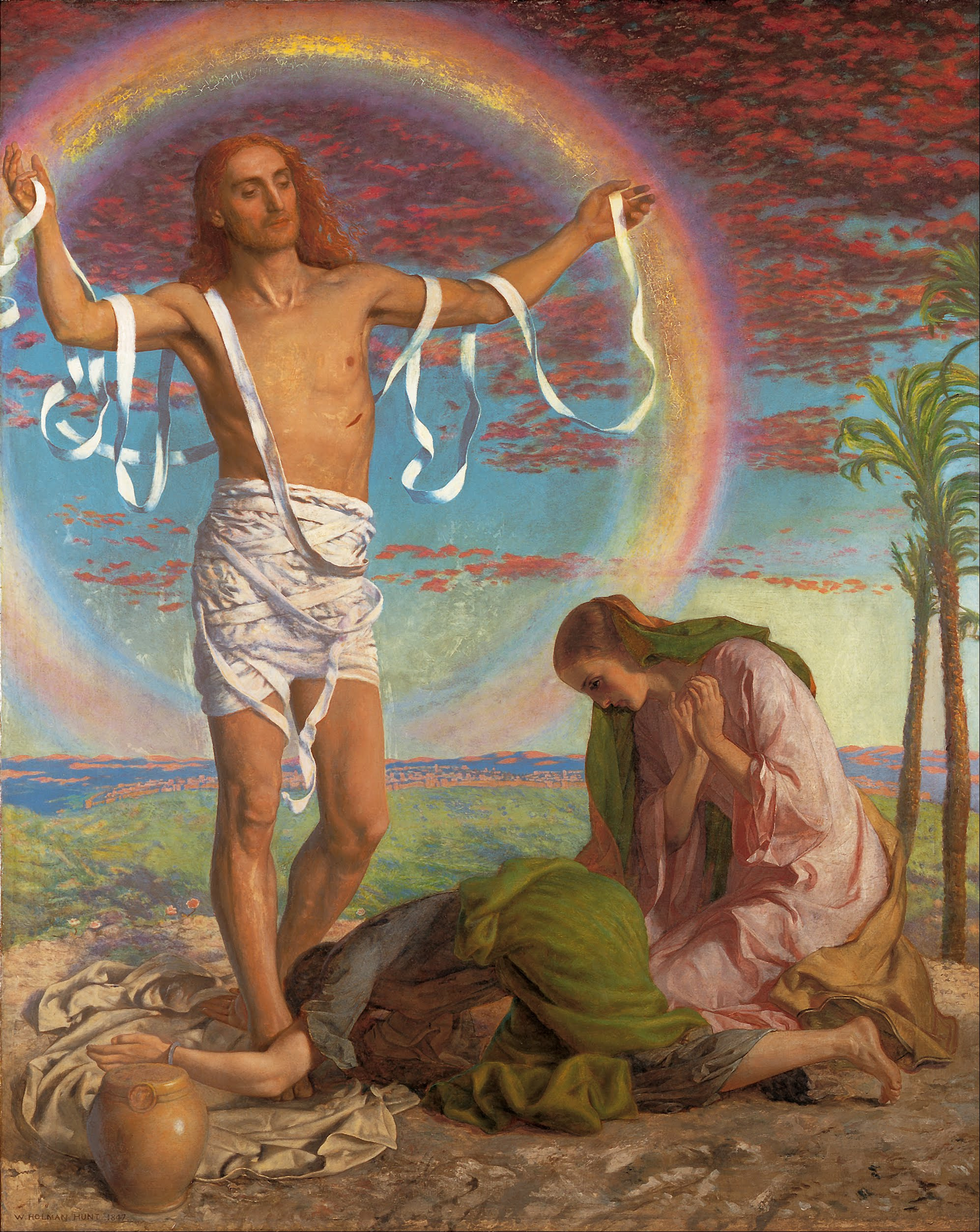
Christ and the Two Marys (1847 and 1897)

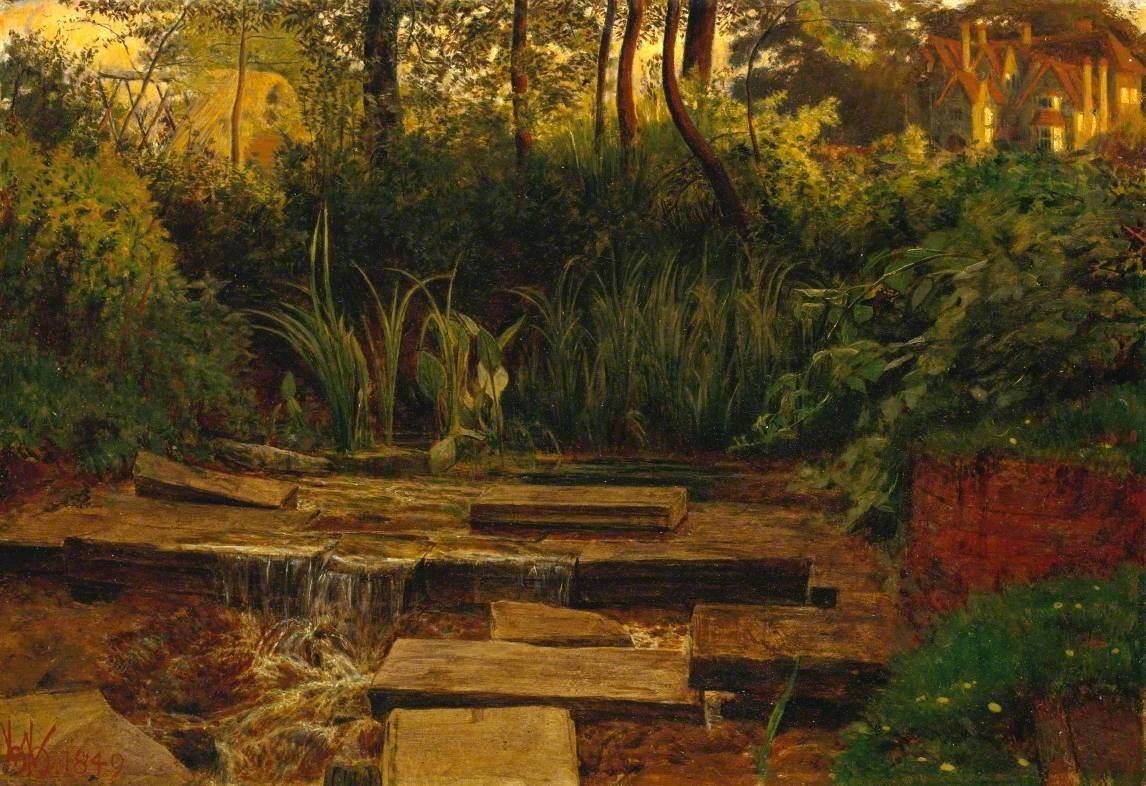
The Haunted Manor (1849)

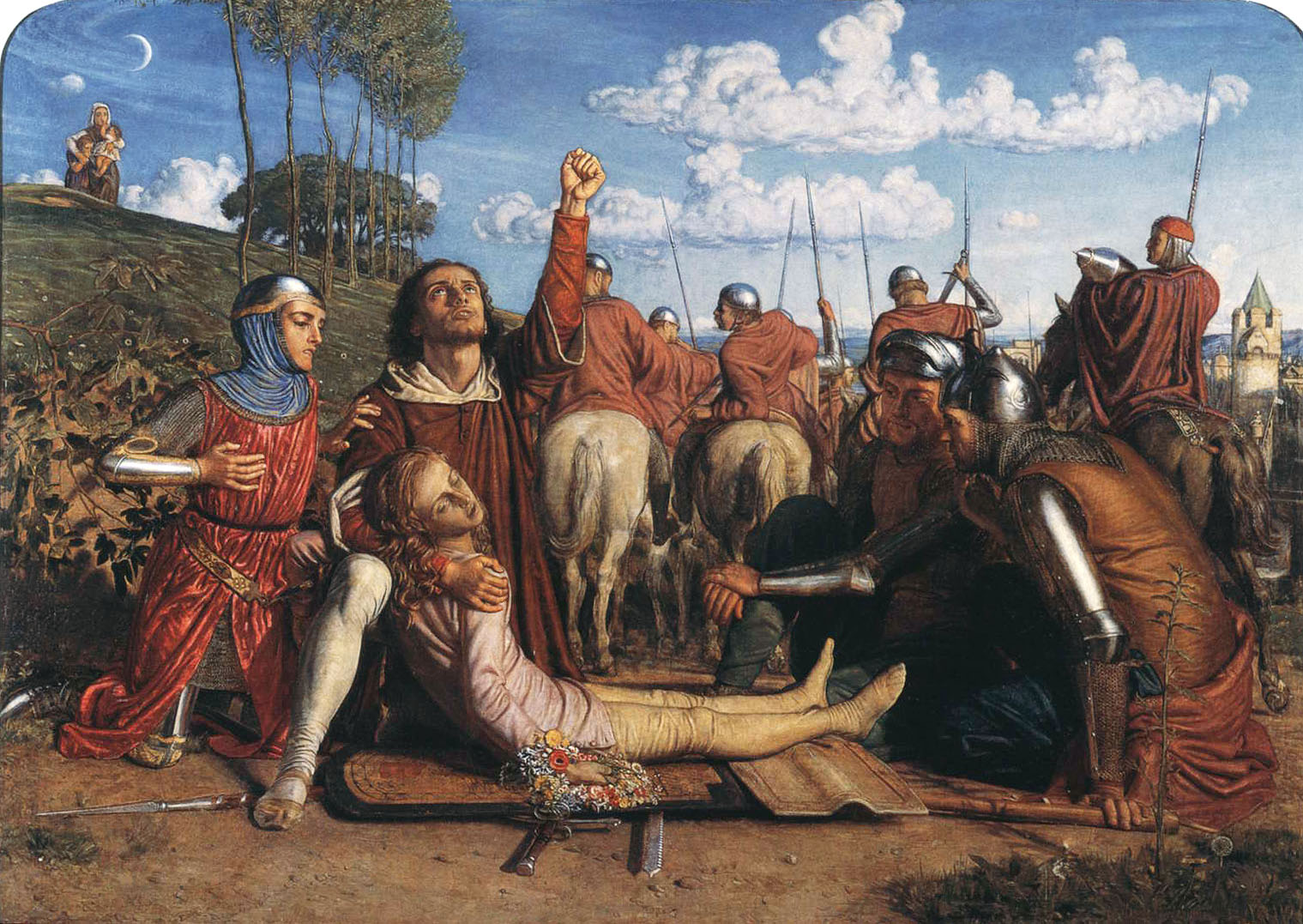
Rienzi vowing to obtain justice for the death of his young brother, slain in a skirmish between the Colonna and the Orsini factions (1849)

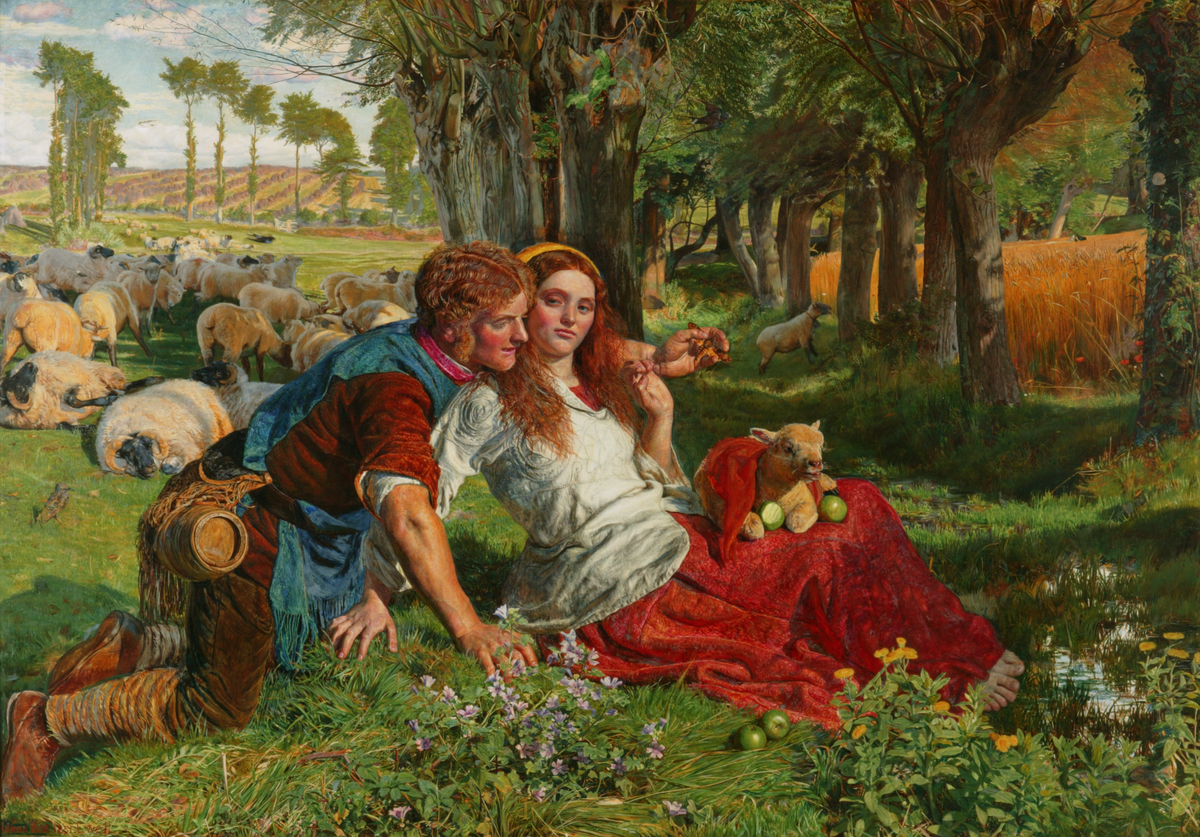
The Hireling Shepherd (1851)

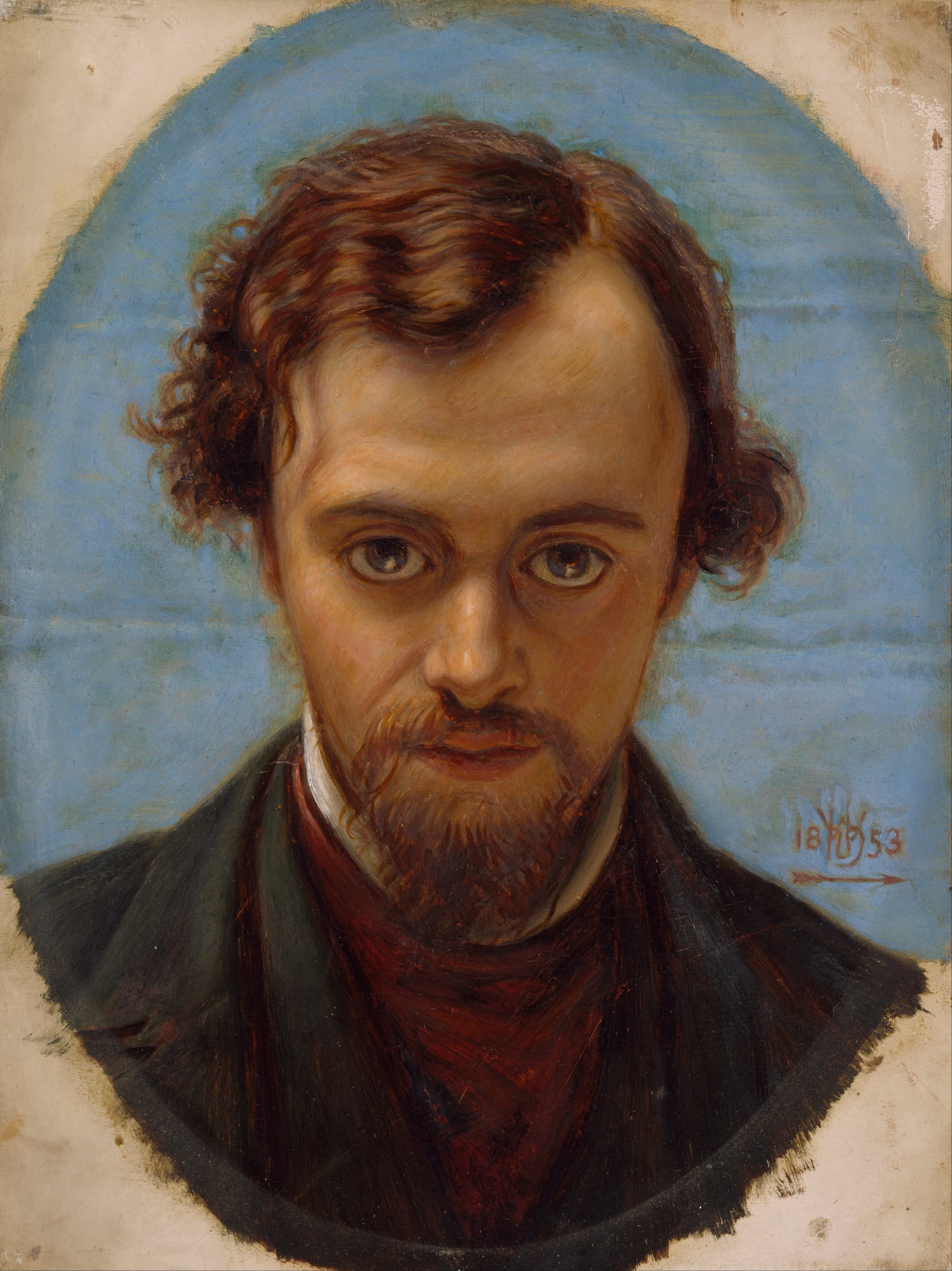
Portrait of Dante Gabriel Rossetti at 22 Years of Age (1853)

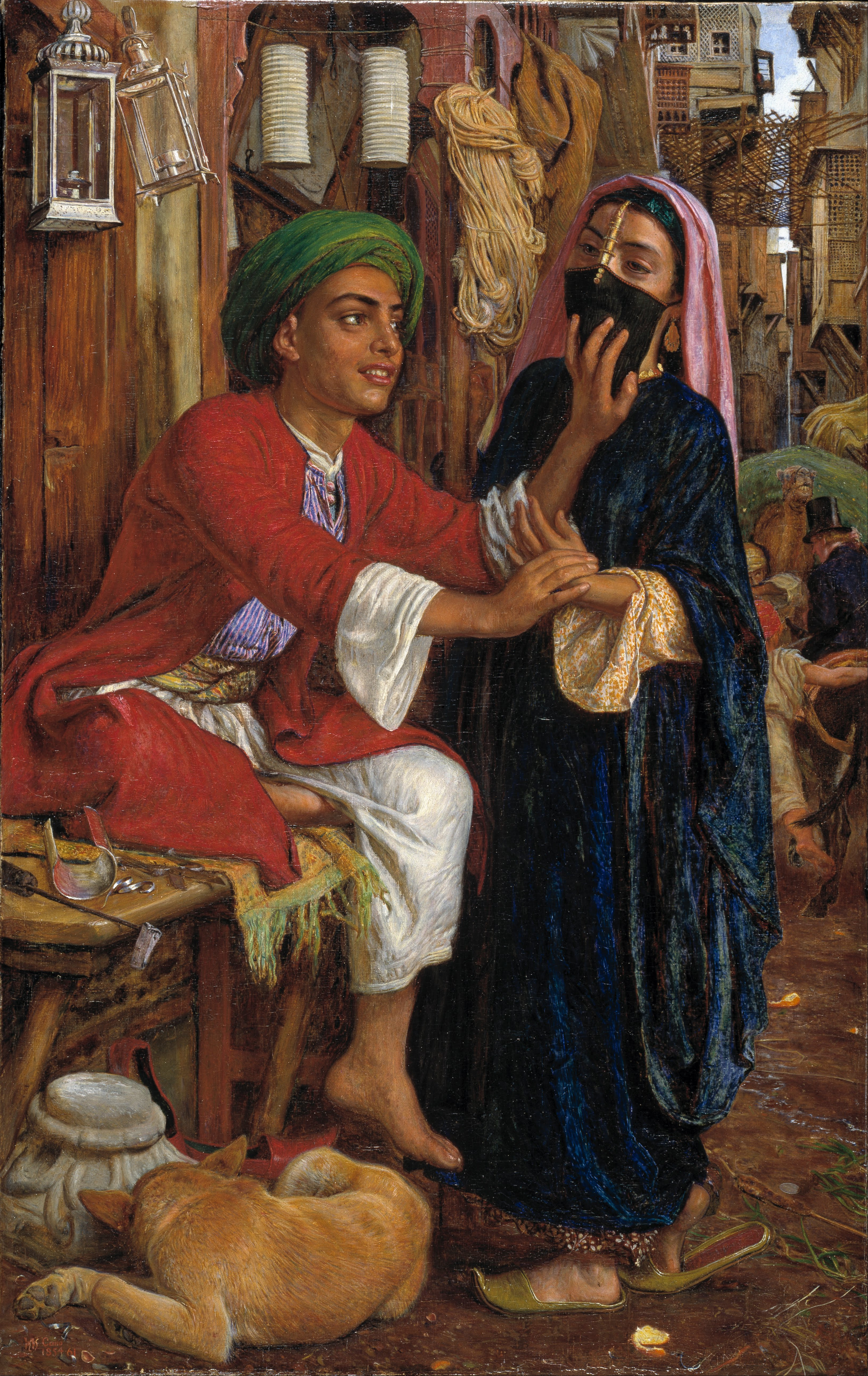
The Lantern Maker's Courtship, A Street Scene in Cairo (1854–56)

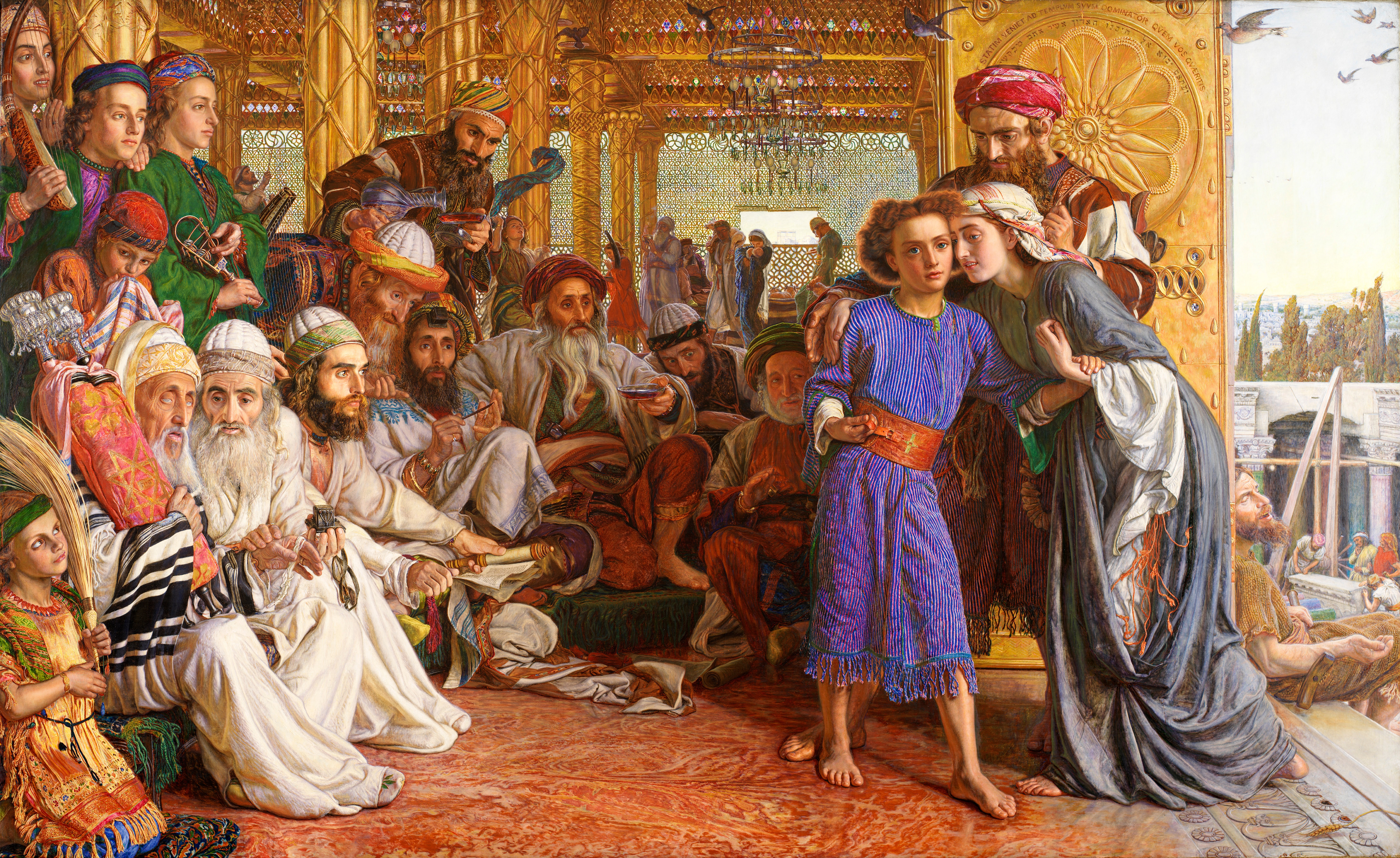
The Finding of the Saviour in the Temple (1854–1860)

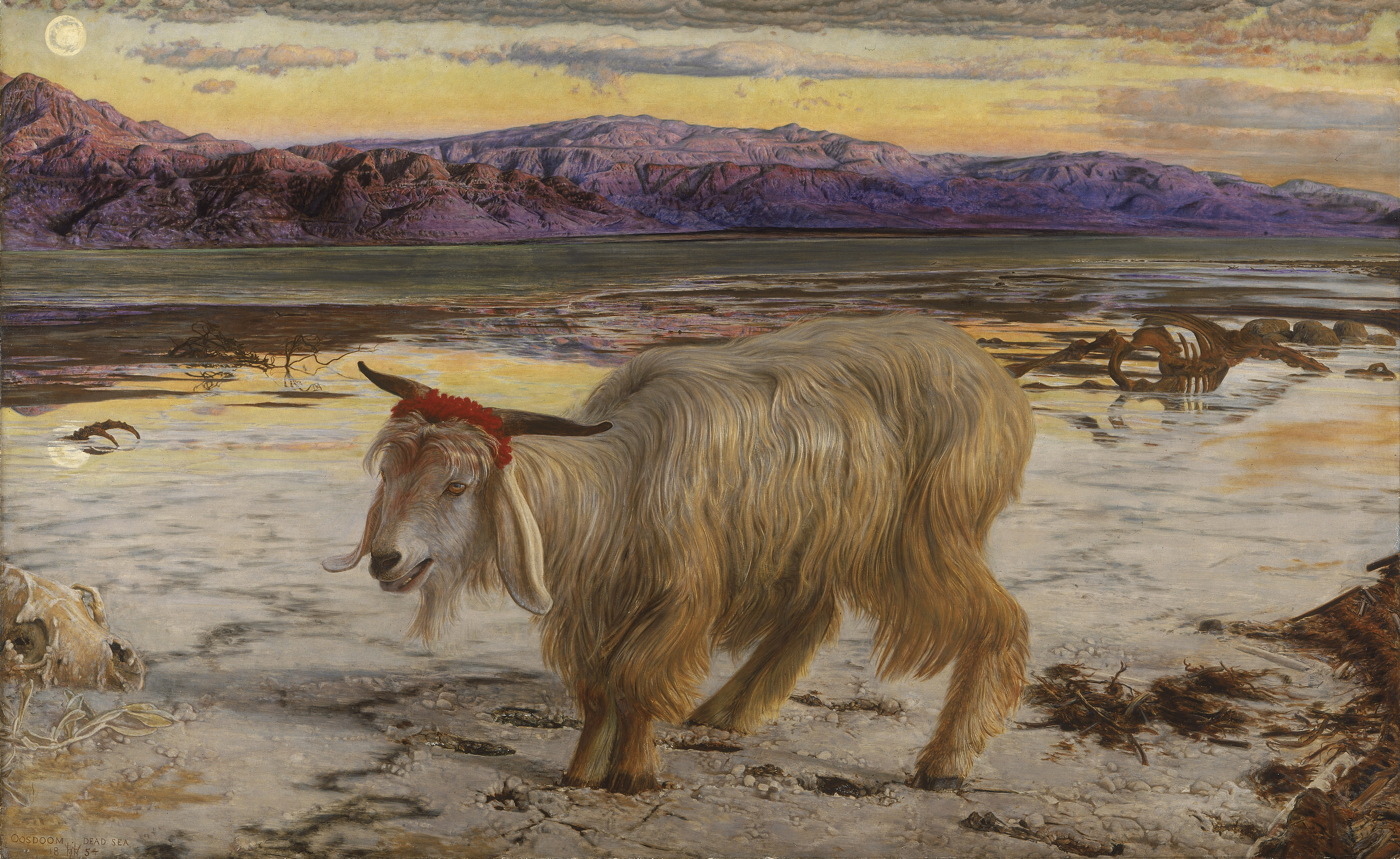
The Scapegoat (1856)

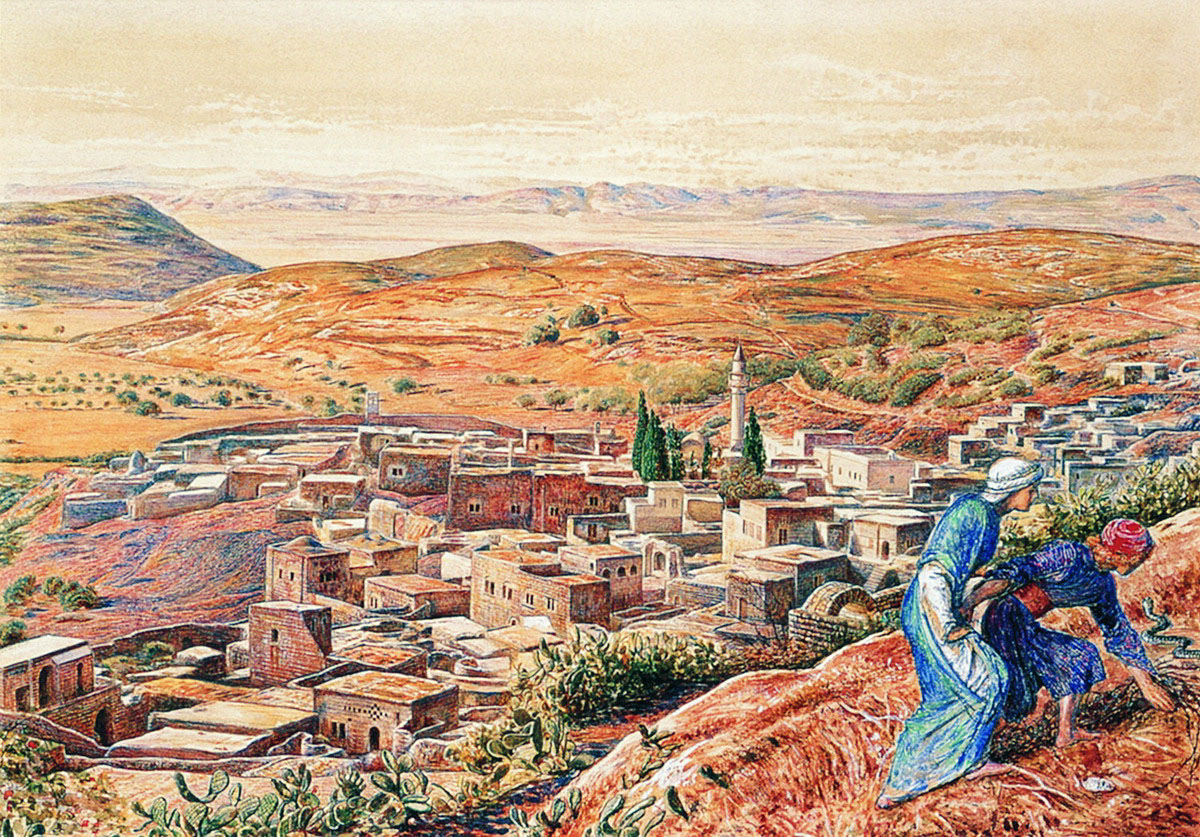
Nazareth (1861)

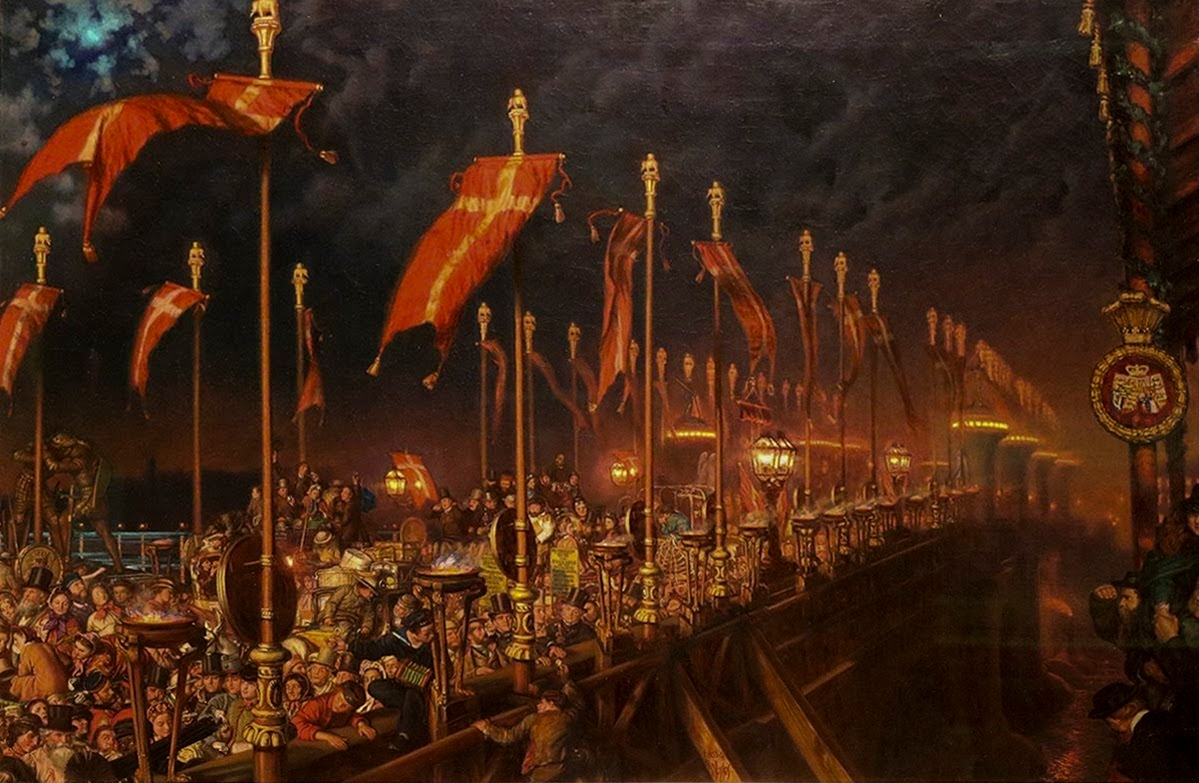
London Bridge on the Night of the Marriage of the Prince and Princess of Wales (1864)

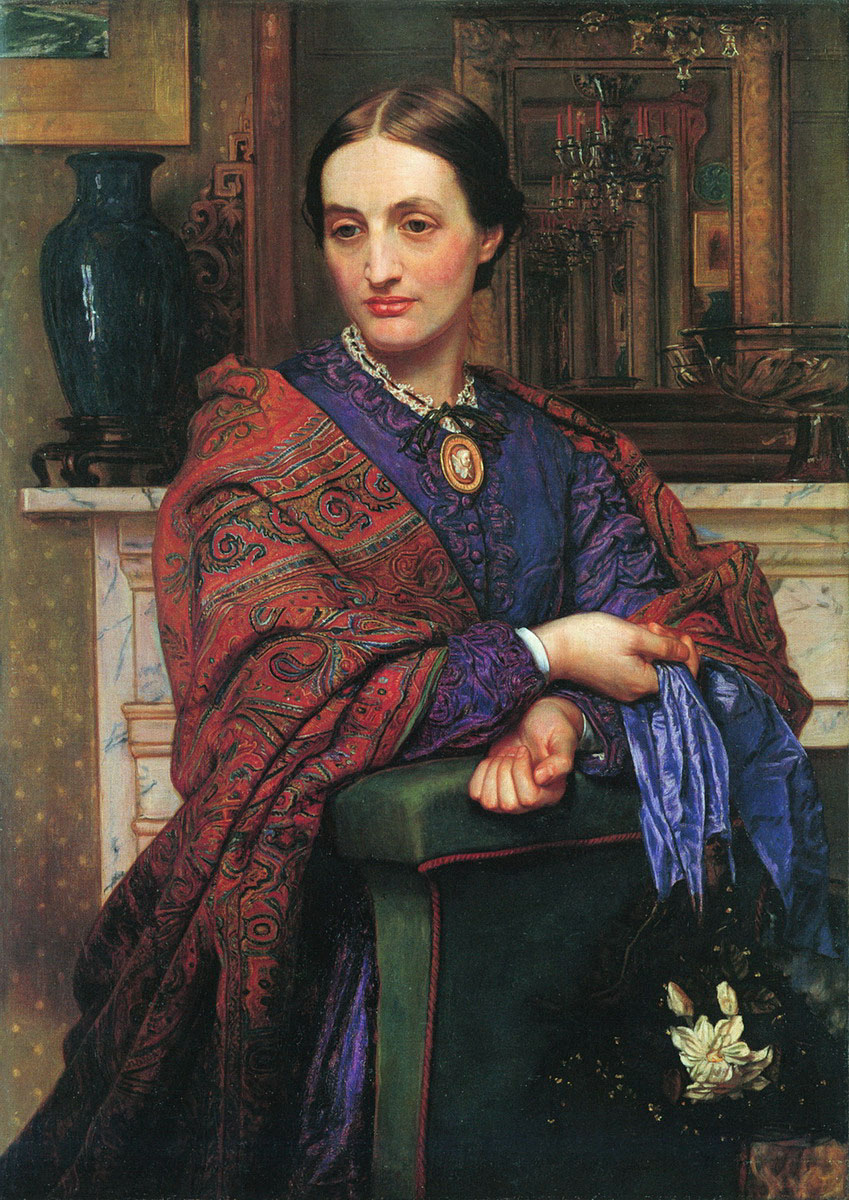
Portrait of Fanny Holman Hunt (1866–67)

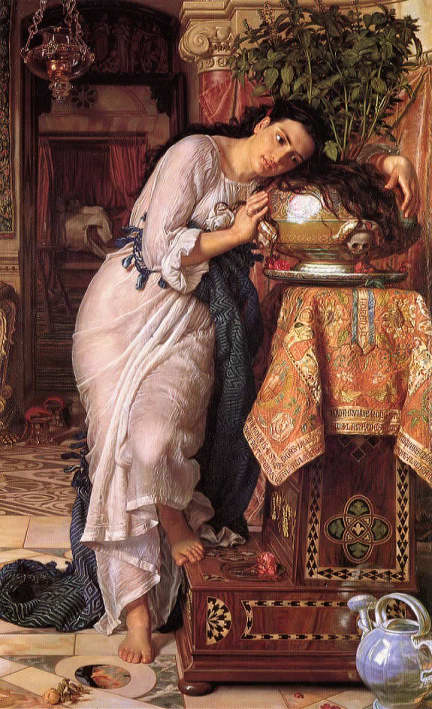
Isabella and the Pot of Basil (1868)

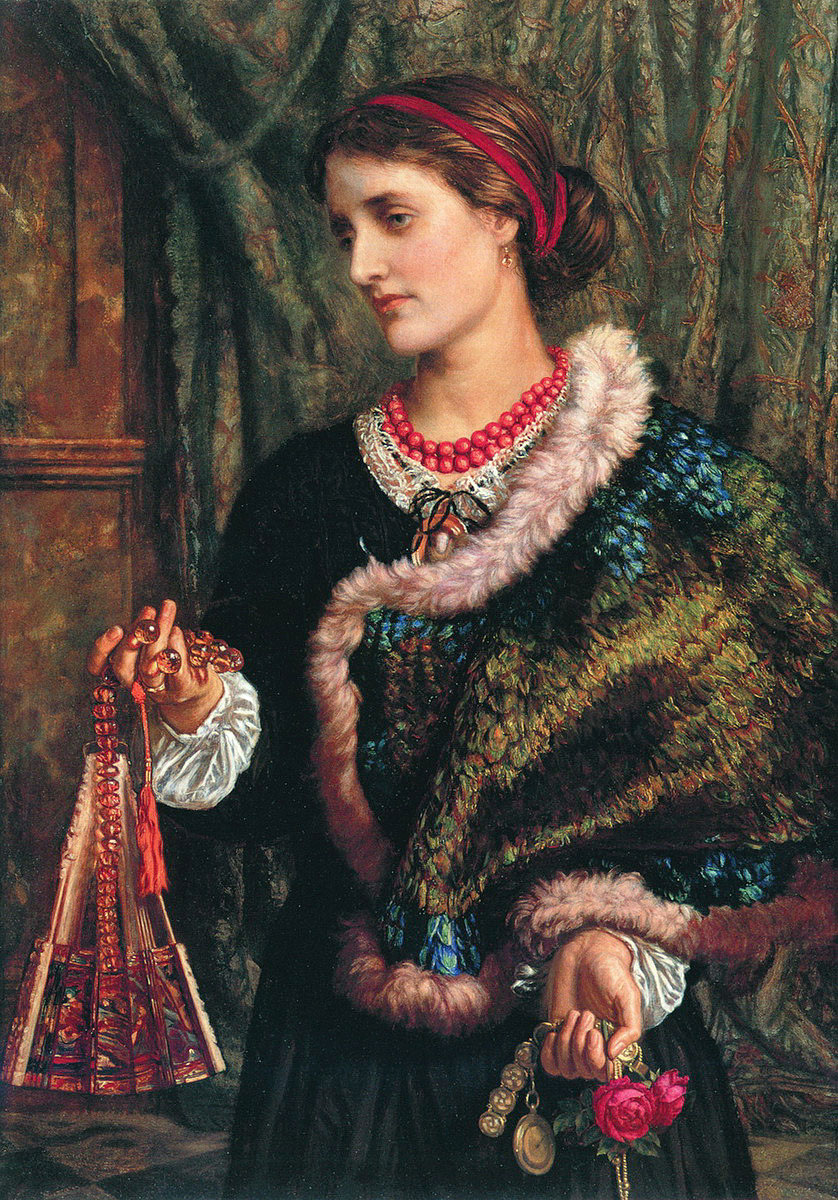
The Birthday (1868)

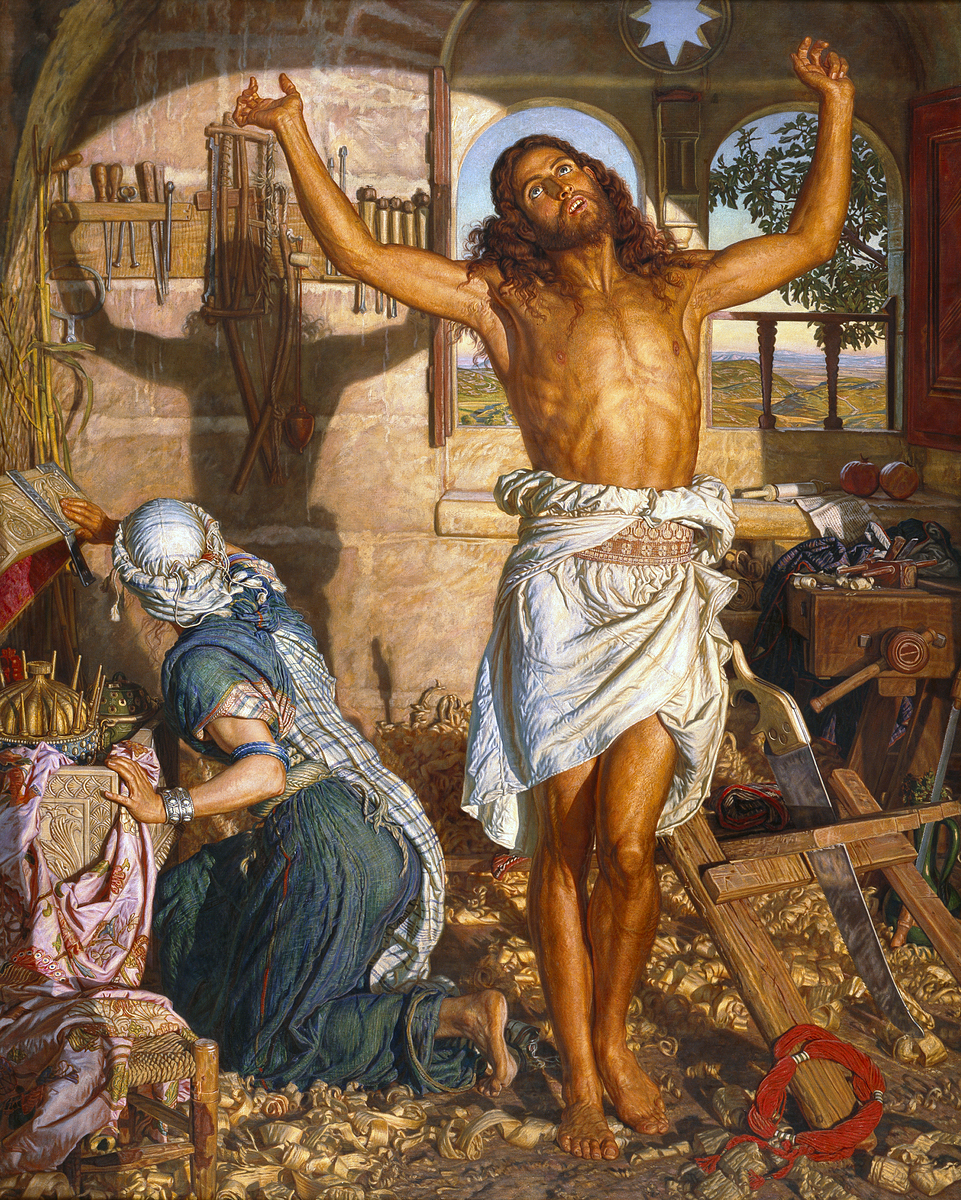
The Shadow of Death (1873)

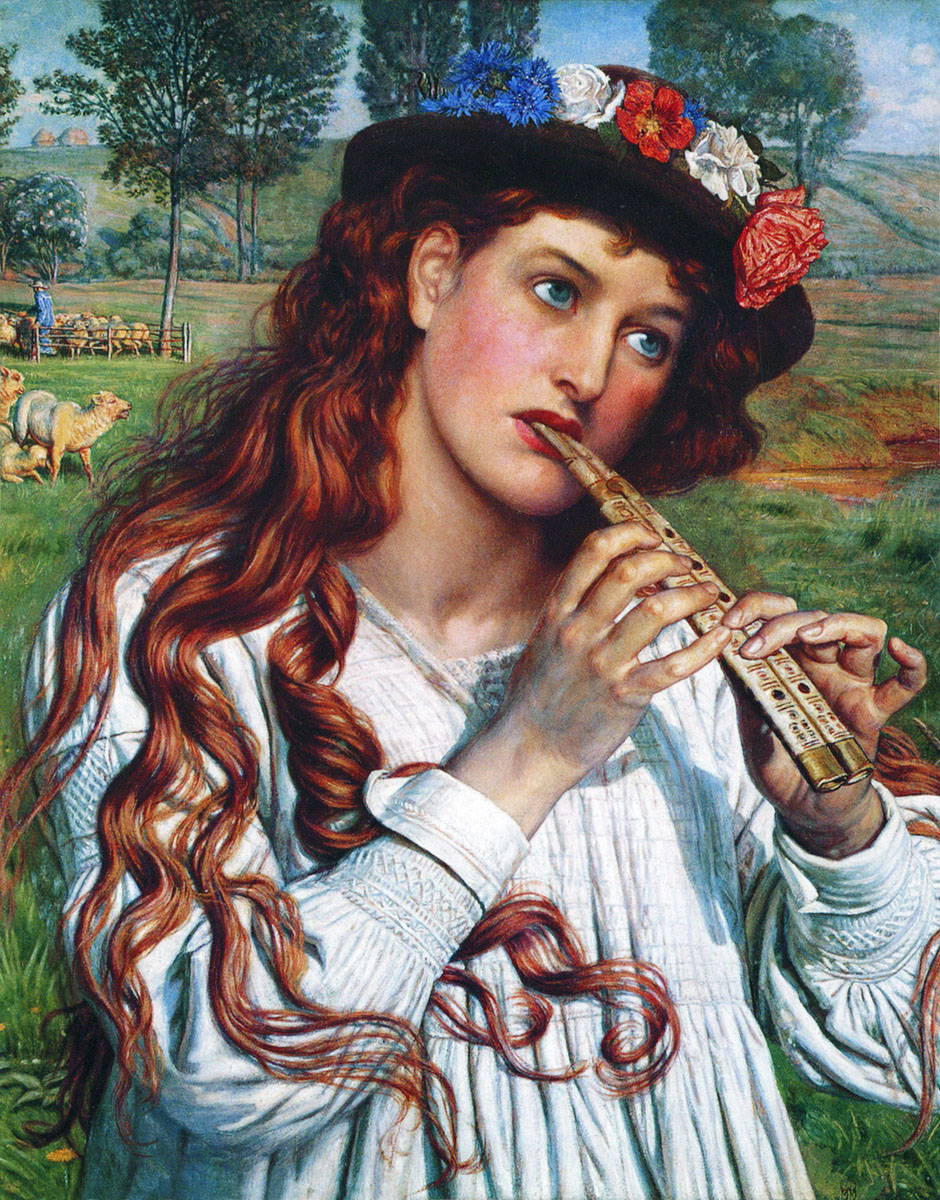
Amaryllis (1884)

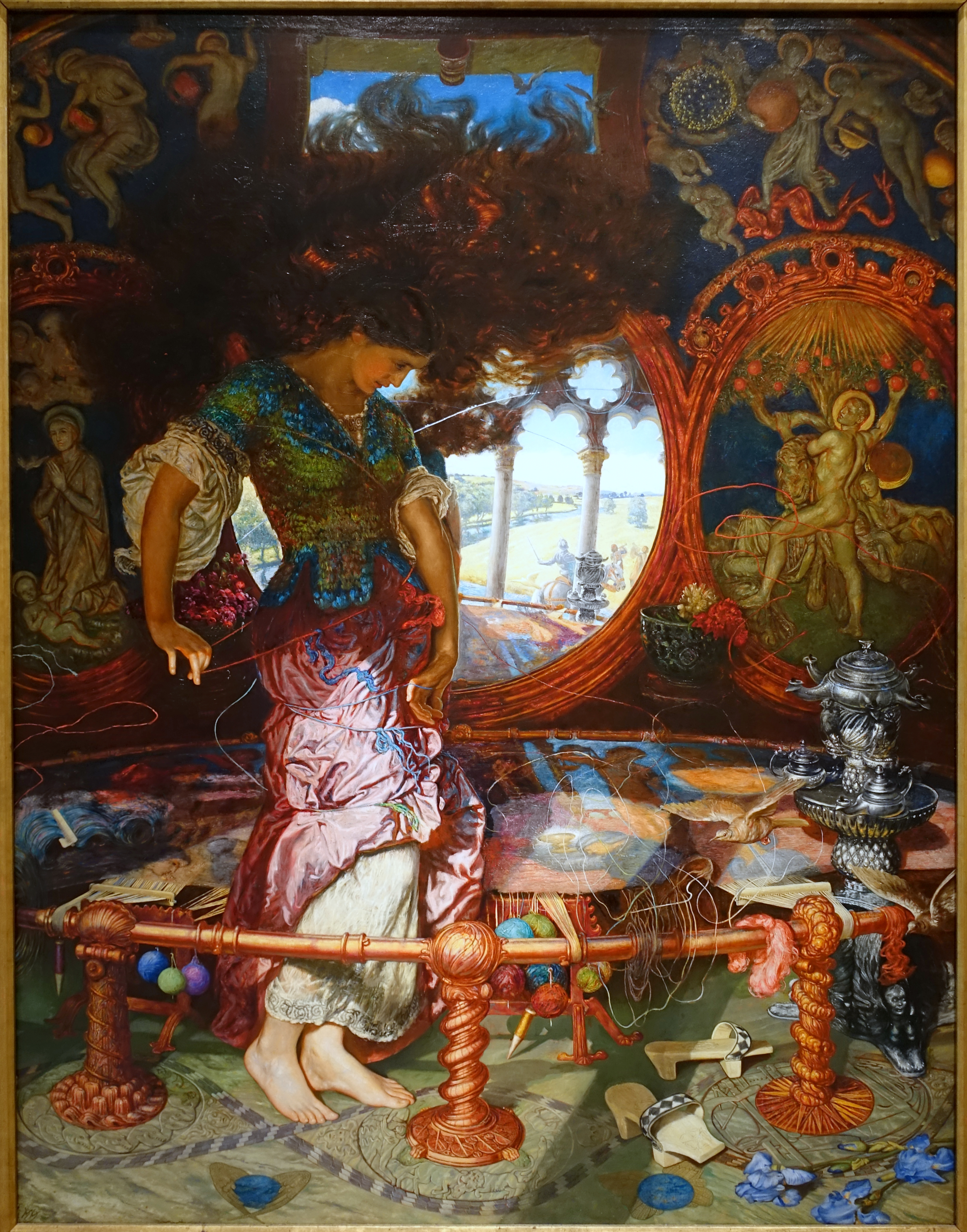
The Lady of Shalott (c. 1890-1905)

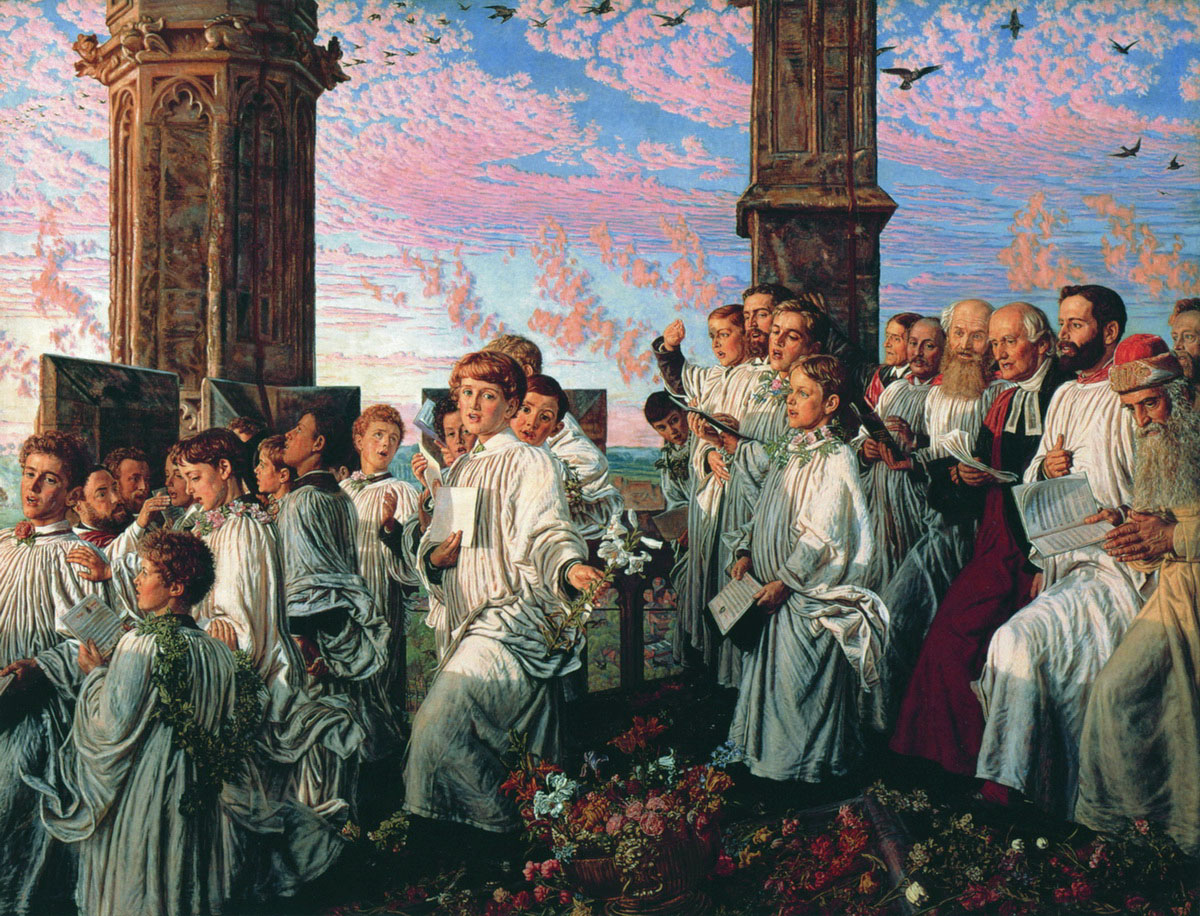
May Morning on Magdalen Tower (1890)

== See also ==
External videos
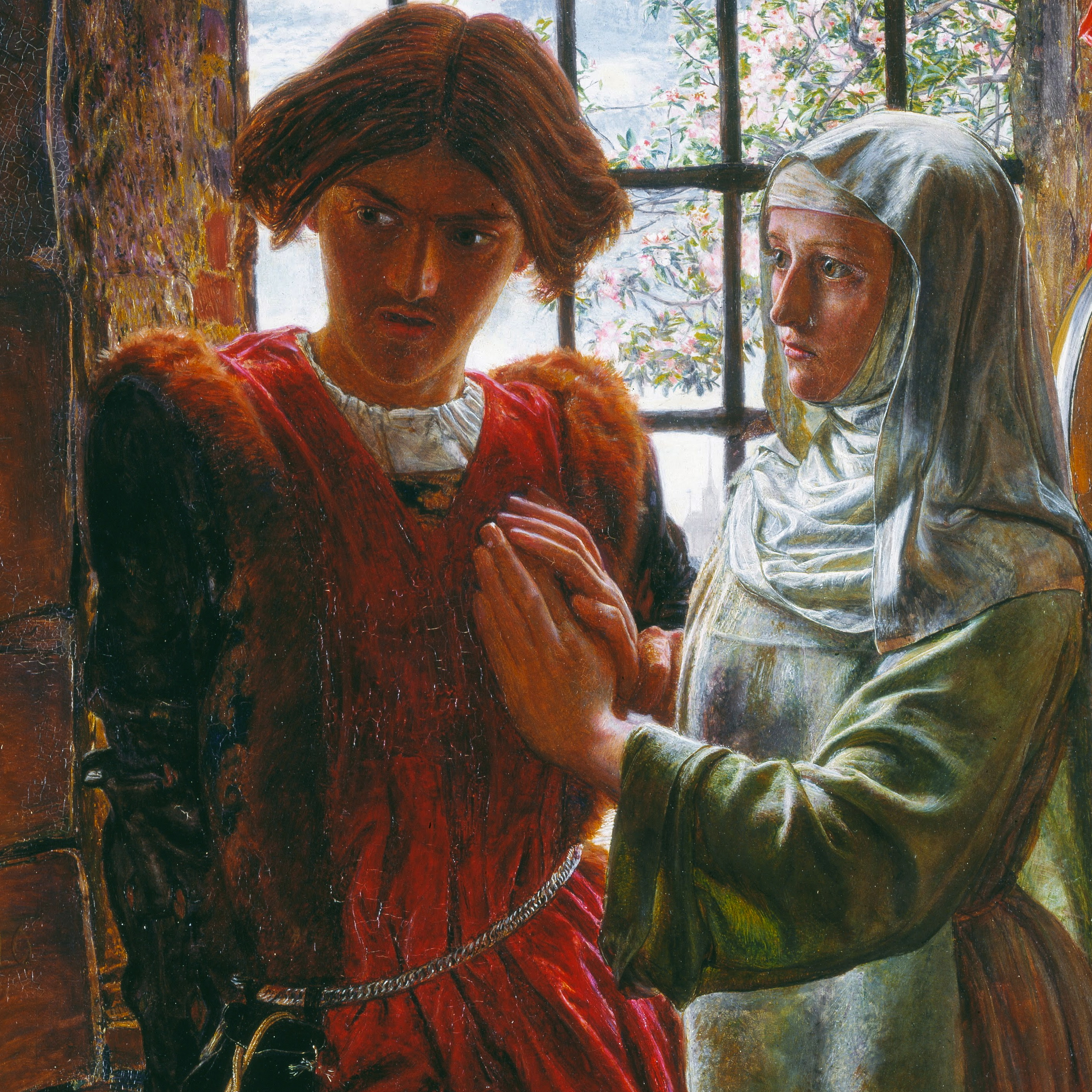
- Hunt's Claudio and Isabella, Smarthistory
- Hunt's The Awakening Conscience, Smarthistory

- English school of painting
- List of Pre-Raphaelite paintings
- List of Orientalist artists
- Orientalism
