= The Haunted Manor (painting) =

Painting by William Holman Hunt

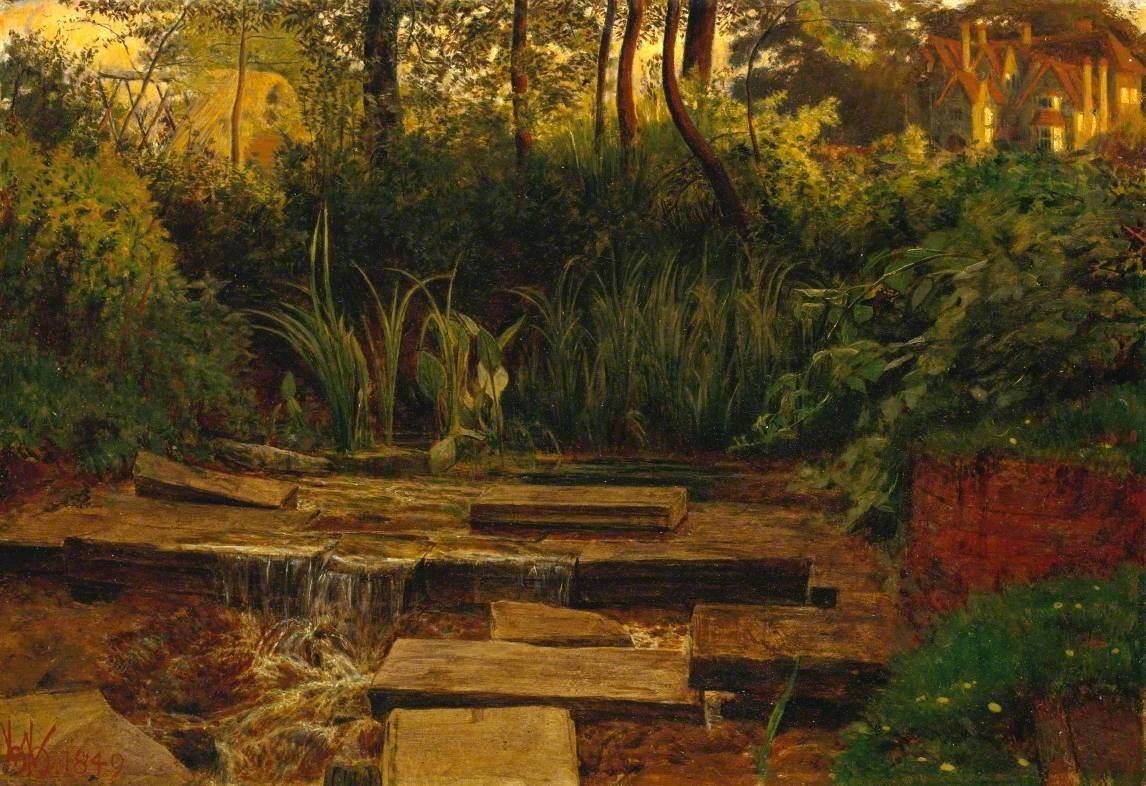
- Artist: William Holman Hunt
- Year: 1849
- Type: Oil on board, landscape painting
- Dimensions: 23.3 cm × 33.7 cm (9.2 in × 13.3 in)
- Location: Tate Britain; London

The Haunted Manor is an 1849 landscape painting by the British artist William Holman Hunt. It depicts a view of a stream filled by slabs of abandoned stone. On the right is a manor house, the windows illuminated by the sun to give it a ghostly appearance.

Holman Hunt, a key figure in the Pre-Raphaelite Brotherhood, produced this scene in Surrey either at Wimbledon Park or on the Hogsmill River near Ewell. It is likely he was accompanied by his friend John Everett Millais, and created this landscape outdoors en plein air. It was first displayed at the 1856 exhibition Liverpool Academy of Arts rather than at the Royal Academy. Today the painting is in the collection of the Tate Britain in London, having been purchased by the gallery in 1967.

== Bibliography ==
- Newall, Christopher. Pre-Raphaelites: Beauty and Rebellion. Liverpool University Press, 2016.
- Staley, Allen. Pre-Raphaelite Vision: Truth to Nature. Harry N. Abrams, 2004.
