= List of works by Edward Robert Hughes =

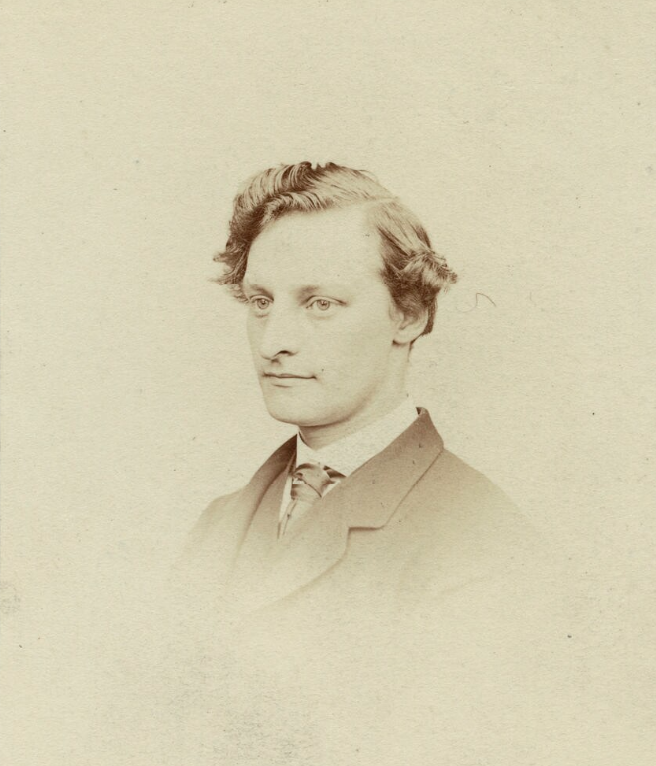
Edward Robert Hughes (photograph by Maull & Co., c. 1870)

This article contains a list of many of the known works by Edward Robert Hughes, who was associated with the Pre-Raphaelite Brotherhood.

== List ==
Image	Title	Year	Description
image missing	The Spinet	1870	Watercolour
image missing	Hushed Music	1871	Oil
	Evensong	1871	Private Collection, Watercolour
	A rainy Sunday	1872	Private Collection, Watercolour
	Sabbath Morn	1872	Private Collection, Oil
	Caroline Hill	1873	Bruce Castle Museum, London, Oil
	Mrs Cecelia Bowen-Summers	1874	
	Gray Hill	1874	Bruce Castle Museum, London, Oil; portrait of John Edward Gray Hill
	A Young Beauty	1875	Private Collection, Oil
	The Picture Book aka A Brother and Sister seated before a Hearth	1875	Private Collection, Oil
	A Basket of Oranges aka George Mackay Macdonald	1878	Philadelphia Museum of Art, USA, Watercolour
image missing	Miss Frances Georgina Mitford	1880	Watercolour
	Landscape with Trees	1880	Kensington Central Library, Oil
	Portrait of a Lady	1883	Chalk
image missing	Robert	1885	Chalk
	Mildred	1885	Chalk
image missing	Henriette Imrie Beausire	1887	Chalk drawing
	Nora Janet Beausire	1887	Chalk drawing
	Bell and Dorothy Freeman	1889	Geffrye Museum, London, Watercolour
	Pack Clouds Away and Welcome Day	1890	Watercolour
image missing	In the Corner Chair	1891	Private Collection, Chalk
image missing	Dealing with the Fairies	1892	Private Collection
image missing	Mrs Douglas Arden	1892	
image missing	The careless Shepherd	1892	
image missing	The Poet Gringoire	1892	
image missing	Fra Lippo Lippi	1893	Watercolour
	Study for a Picture aka Fra Lippo Lippi	1893	Williamson Art Gallery and Museum, Birkenhead, Drawing
image missing	Biancabella e Samaritana aka Biancabella and Samaritana, her Snake Sister	1894	
	Portrait of a Child with a Chair	1894	Chalk
	Betruccio's Bride	1895	Private Collection
	Portrait of a Man	1895	Chalk
	Elaine Blunt	1896	Chalk
	The Shrew Katherina	1896	Private Collection
image missing	Margaret Webster	1897	Chalk
	Hilda Virtue Tebbs	1897	
	Men in the Park	1897	Men in the Park
	Diana's Maidens aka A Coward	1898	Private Collection, Watercolour
	Lewis F. Day	1900	
image missing	Gwendolen Freeman	1901	
	Dorothea	1901	Pencil
	A Witch	1902	Royal Collection, Watercolour
	Margaret Ellinor Morse	1902	Private Collection
	Anthony Freeman	1903	Watercolour
image missing	The lesser Light	1904	
image missing	Dusky Night	1905	Private Collection
	Wings of the Morning	1905	Private Collection, Mixed Media
image missing	The Mantilla	1906	
	Dick the Shepherd	1906	
	Orazio Cervi	1906	
	The Valkyrie's Vigil	1906	Private Collection
	Heart of Snow	1907	
	Monna Giovanna	1907	Watercolour
	Avery Colebrook as a Boy	1908	Pastel
	All that I Saw at the Wedding aka Bridesmaid	1908	Harris Museum, Preston, Watercolour
	Portrait of an elderly Lady	1908	Chalk
	Head Study of a Young Girl	1909	Private Collection
	The Grass of Parnassus	1909	The Grass of Parnassus
image missing	Shrouded Moon	1910	Watercolour
image missing	Waning Moon	1910	Watercolour
image missing	Waxing Moon	1910	Watercolour
	Radiant Moon	1910	Private Collection, Watercolour
image missing	Study of a Head	1911	Private Collection
	Christopher Garnett	1911	Watercolour
	Summer Fantasy	1911	
	The Journey's End	1911	Private Collection, Watercolour
	Weary Moon	1911	Watercolour
	Blondel's Quest	1912	Ashmolean Museum, Oxford, Watercolour
	Marion Fry Pease, Daughter of Thos. Pease	1912	Pastel
	Pre-historic Iona	1912	Watercolour
	Woman walking her Dog aka The Transformation of Callisto	c. 1900	Watercolour
	William Holman Hunt	c.1894	Private Collection
	Oh, What's That in the Hollow?	c.1895	Royal Watercolour Society, Watercolour
	Twixt Hope and Fear	c.1900	Oil
	The Princess out of School	c.1901	National Gallery of Victoria, Melbourne, Australia, Watercolour
	Dream Idyll (A Valkyrie)	c.1902	Private Collection
	The Light of the World	c.1902	Watercolour
	Alphonse Legros	c.1905	Harvard Art Museums, Cambridge, USA
	William Callow	c.1906	National Portrait Gallery, London
	Midsummer Eve	c.1908	Private Collection
image missing	A Mediterranean Landscape	date unknown	Oil
image missing	A misty River	date unknown	Oil
image missing	Dayspring	date unknown	
image missing	Isle of the Stormy Capes, Iona	date unknown	Watercolour
image missing	Returning Home	date unknown	Oil
image missing	The Shepherd Boy	date unknown	Oil
	An Old Stump in Epping Forest	date unknown	Oil
	Byram's Tryst	date unknown	Oil
	Day	date unknown	Private Collection, Watercolour
	Portrait of Rosalind	date unknown	Private Collection
	In Dreams	date unknown	
	Making Music	date unknown	
	Elsie Bibby	date unknown	
	Margaret Webster	date unknown	
	Study of a young Tennis Player	date unknown	Mixed Media
	Charles Edward Leith-Hay Clark	date unknown	Leith Hall, Kennethmont, Oil
	John Mackenzie- A Cuillin Guide	date unknown	Chalk
	Milkmaid in front of a Landscape	date unknown	Oil
	The Pipe Smoker	date unknown	Chalk
	Reverie	date unknown	Pastel
	Royal Procession	date unknown	Knohl Collection, USA, Oil
	Study of a Male Head	date unknown	Chalk
	The Expulsion	date unknown	Cartwright Hall, Bradford
	Tithe in Kind	date unknown	Watercolour
	A Viking, Portrait of Harold Norbury	date unknown	Mixed Media
	With the Wind	date unknown	Private Collection, Pastel
	Woman in a Shawl	date unknown	Mixed Media
	A young Child	date unknown	Chalk
	The Nymph Callisto	date unknown	Watercolour
	Trees at Twilight	date unknown	Mixed Media

== See also ==
- List of Pre-Raphaelite paintings
