= April Love =

April Love may refer to:

- April Love (film), a 1957 musical film
  - "April Love" (song), a song from the film
- April Love (painting), an Arthur Hughes painting
