= Midsummer Eve (painting) =

Painting by Edward Robert Hughes

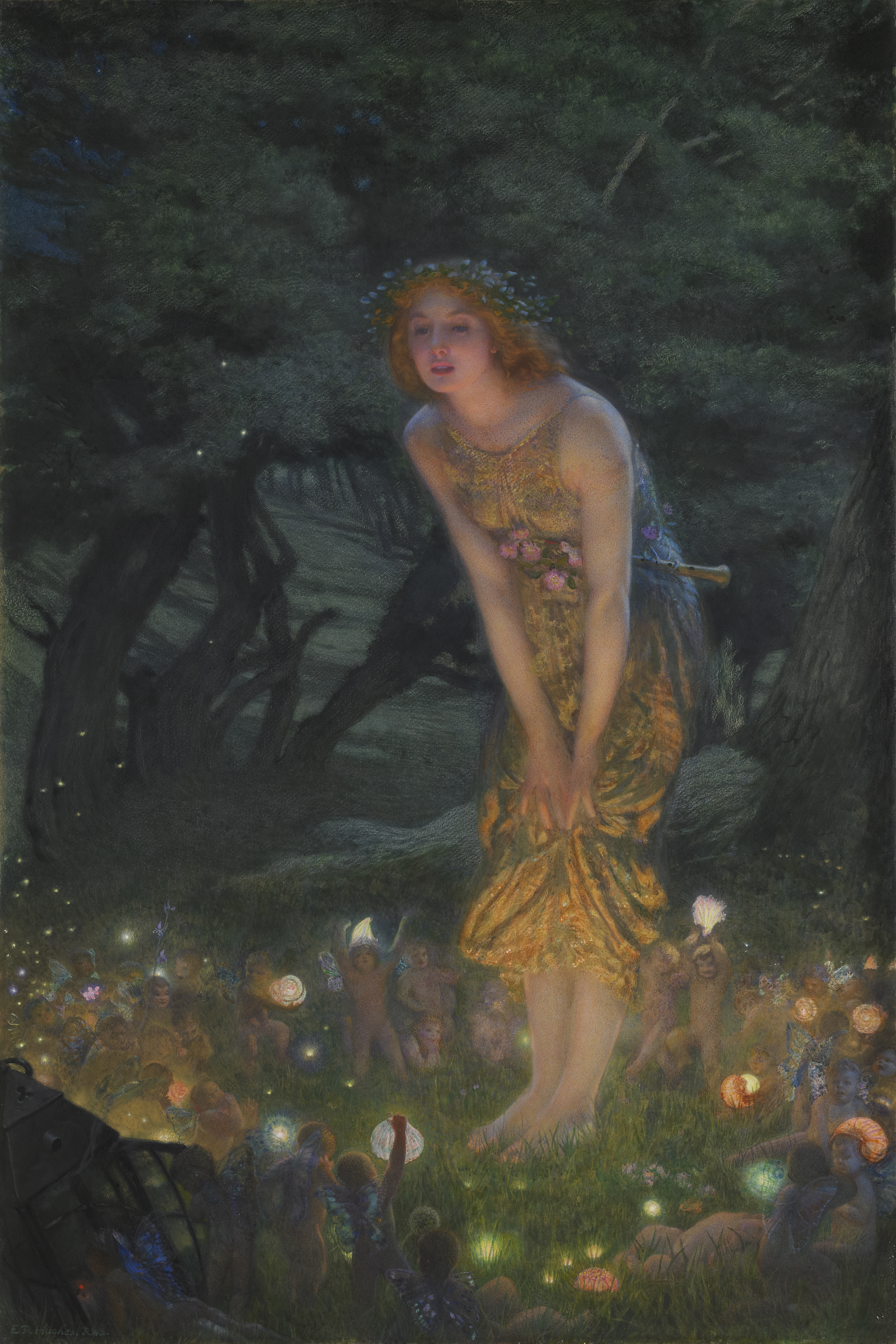
- Artist: Edward Robert Hughes
- Year: c. 1908
- Medium: Watercolour with gouache
- Dimensions: 114.3 cm × 76.2 cm (45.0 in × 30.0 in)

Midsummer Eve is a 1908 watercolour painting by Edward Robert Hughes. The painting depicts a young woman in a woodland setting surrounded by a ring of fairies who are holding aloft glowing objects. Hughes may have drawn inspiration from William Shakespeare's comedy A Midsummer Night's Dream and Rudyard Kipling's 1906 fantasy book Puck of Pook's Hill.

Midsummer Eve was first exhibited at the Royal Watercolour Society and is considered one of the most iconic fairy images, a popular Victorian era genre. It is part of a private collection and has been exhibited at the Frick Collection and the Birmingham Museum and Art Gallery.

== Background and history ==
Paintings of fairies were a popular Victorian genre since the early 19th century, though Edward Robert Hughes had initially built a career as a portrait painter for the upper classes. A member of the Pre-Raphaelite Brotherhood, he worked as a studio assistant to William Holman Hunt, who inspired him to take on commissions of a fantastical nature. Through the Royal Watercolour Society he created several fantasy-themed watercolours late in his career, from 1902 to 1913.

The title Midsummer Eve evokes William Shakespeare's comedy A Midsummer Night's Dream. Hughes may have also drawn inspiration for the work from two recently published books. Rudyard Kipling's fantasy book Puck of Pook's Hill and J. M. Barrie's Peter Pan in Kensington Gardens were both published in 1906. In Kipling's book, two children perform A Midsummer Night's Dream three times in a fairy ring, inadvertently summoning the fairy Puck. The fairies' illumination in the painting elicits the orders given by the faerie queen Titania:

The honey-bags steal from the humble bees,
And for night-tapers crop their waxen thighs
And light them at the fiery glow-worm's eyes,
To have my love to bed and to arise.

— Titania, in William Shakespeare, A Midsummer Night's Dream, III. 1. 174–177

Hughes exhibited Midsummer Eve at the Royal Watercolour Society in 1908. The painting was sold at auction in London on 15 June 1982 for £18,000 and is now part of a private collection. It was displayed at the 1998 exhibition Victorian Fairy Painting at the Frick Collection and the 2015 exhibition Enchanted Dreams: The Pre-Raphaelite Art of ER Hughes at the Birmingham Museum and Art Gallery.

== Depiction ==
Midsummer Eve is a watercolour heightened with gouache on paper, mounted on cardboard. The fantastical painting falls within the traditional Victorian genre depicting fairies. A young, smiling woman in a flowery gown is shown bending over a ring of frolicking fairies who are holding up globular lantern bowls, glowing objects resembling shells, seed pods, and flowers, possibly lit from within by glowworms. The darkness of the woodland surrounding is contrasted by the light produced by the objects and what could be light given off by fireflies. The young woman holds a flute under her arm and a lantern that has fallen to the ground has a candle that is being blown out by one of the fairies.

== Reception ==
Midsummer Eve was one of the most iconic fairy images of its time. It has been described as "mistily romantic". A withering review of the Hughes' watercolours by Simon Poë in The British Art Journal related that "during this period, as the safe Victorian world began to spin out of control around him (suffragettes, Trades Unions, Ireland, Germany), Hughes took a fatal step towards charming nullity and became that most escapist of Edwardian things, a fairy painter". The painting is among Hughes's most popular works and is frequently depicted on posters, calendars, and greeting cards.

== See also ==
- List of works by Edward Robert Hughes
