= Arthur Hughes (artist) =

English painter

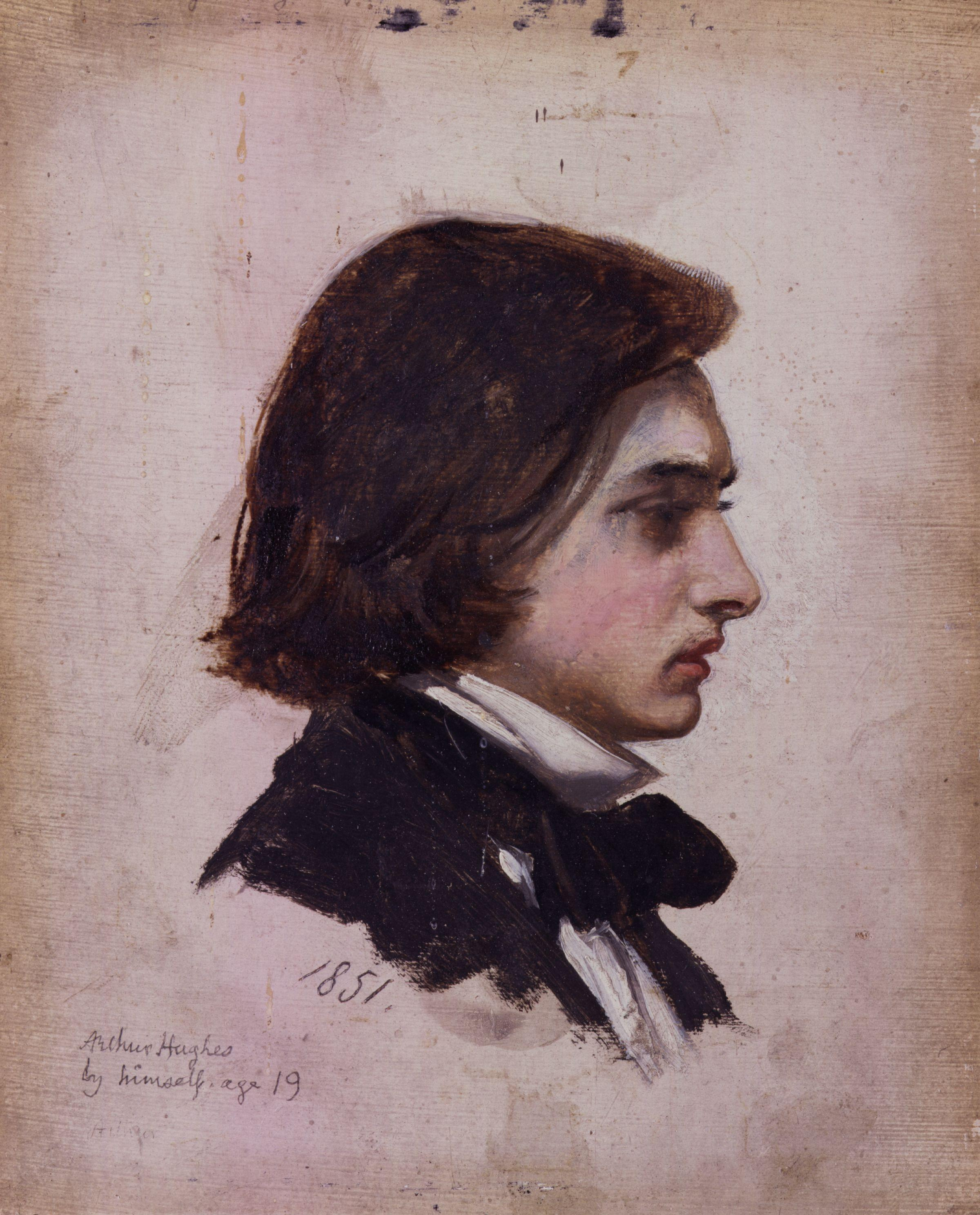
An 1851 self-portrait

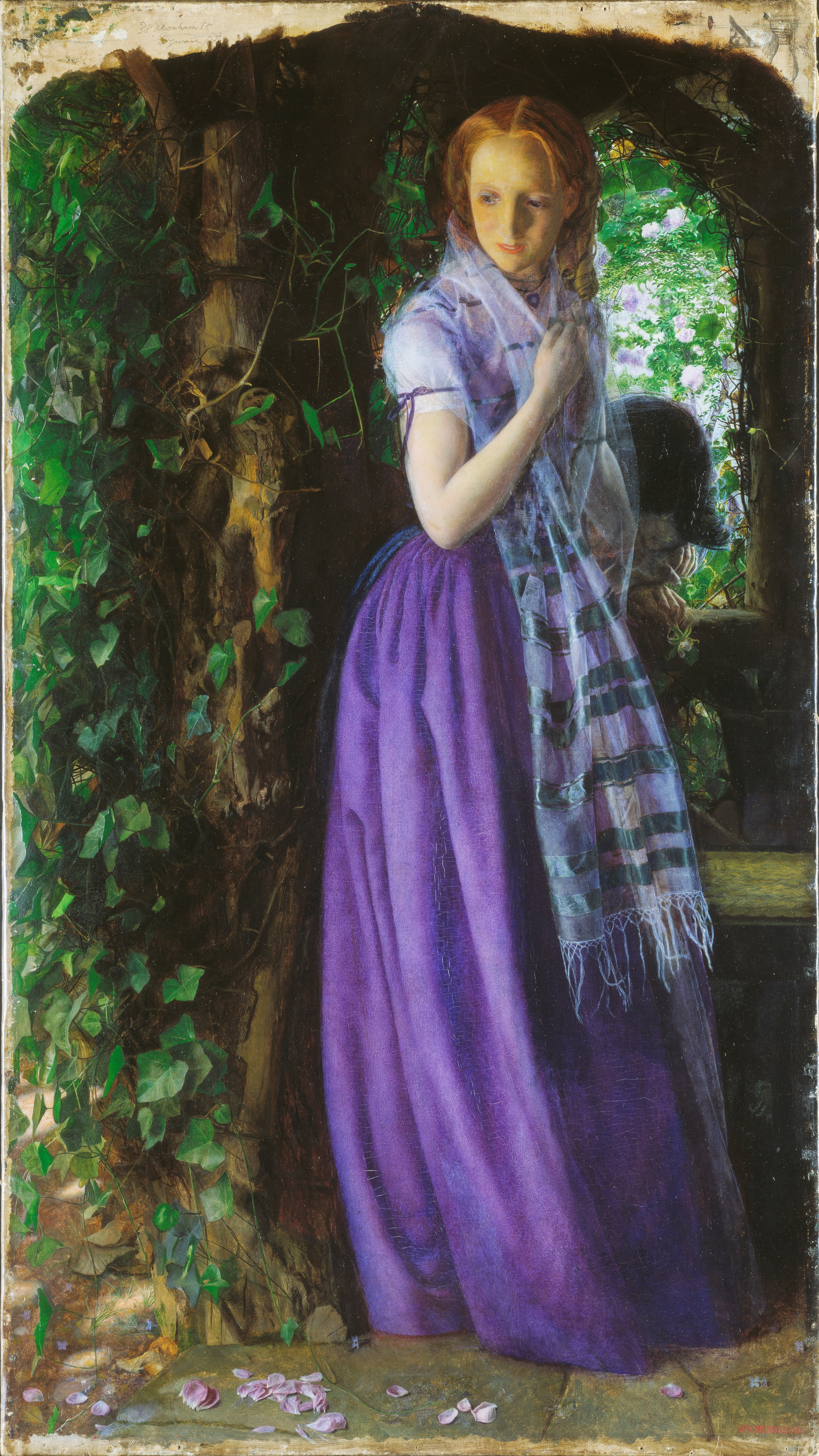
April Love, 1856

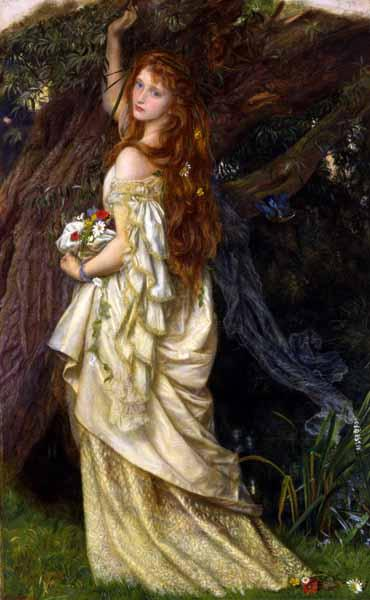
Ophelia

Arthur Hughes (27 January 1832 – 22 December 1915) was an English painter and illustrator associated with the Pre-Raphaelite Brotherhood.

== Biography ==
Hughes was born in London. In 1846 he entered the art school at Somerset House, his first master being Alfred Stevens, and later entered the Royal Academy schools. It was here, after reading a copy of The Germ, that he met John Everett Millais, Holman Hunt, and Dante Gabriel Rossetti, although he never became an official member of the Pre-Raphaelite group of painters. His first picture, Musidora, was hung at the Royal Academy when he was only 17, and thenceforth he contributed almost annually not only to the Royal Academy but later also to the Grosvenor and New Gallery exhibitions. After having his painting Ophelia hung near Millais' version of the same name, they became friends and Hughes served as the model for the male figure in The Proscribed Royalist.

In 1855 Hughes married Tryphena Foord, his model for April Love. They had five children of whom, Arthur Foord Hughes, and Amy Hughes became painters. Hughes died in Kew Green, London in 1915, leaving about 700 known paintings and drawings, along with over 750 book illustrations. Following the death of Tryphena Hughes in 1921, their daughter Emily had to move to a smaller house. There was, therefore, a shortage of space. As a result, she had her father's remaining preparatory sketches, and all his private papers and correspondence, destroyed. He was the uncle of Edward Robert Hughes.

Hughes is buried in Richmond Cemetery.

== Works ==
His best-known paintings are April Love and The Long Engagement, both of which depict troubled couples contemplating the transience of love and beauty. They were inspired by John Everett Millais's earlier "couple" paintings but place far greater emphasis on the pathos of human inability to maintain the freshness of youthful feeling in comparison to the regenerative power of nature. April Love was purchased from Hughes by William Morris.

Like Millais, Hughes also painted Ophelia (which is housed at Toledo Museum of Art) and illustrated Keats's poem The Eve of St. Agnes. Hughes's version of the latter is in the form of a secular triptych, a technique he repeated for scenes from Shakespeare's As You Like It. His works are noted for their magical, glowing colouring and delicate draughtsmanship.

The oil portrait Springtide, first exhibited in Dublin in 1855, features his wife Tryphena.

In 1857 Hughes was persuaded by Dante Gabriel Rossetti to join with the group of young artists who were to head to Oxford to paint the walls of the newly-finished debating chamber of the Oxford Union Society. Rossetti had chosen the Legend of King Arthur as the theme of frescoes and Hughes was delegated to paint a panel depicting The Death of Arthur. Unfortunately the walls were not properly prepared for the paintings and they soon deteriorated and now only the barest outlines remain of the works.

=== Illustrations ===
Although most of Hughes's later paintings are not well regarded, it is considered that the black and white drawings of his later career were some of his best. He illustrated several books, including Tom Brown’s Schooldays (1869), George Macdonald's At the Back of the North Wind (1871) and The Princess and the Goblin (1872) and Christina Rossetti’s Sing Song (1872) and Speaking Likenesses (1874).

He also produced numerous illustrations for Norman MacLeod's monthly magazine, Good Words.

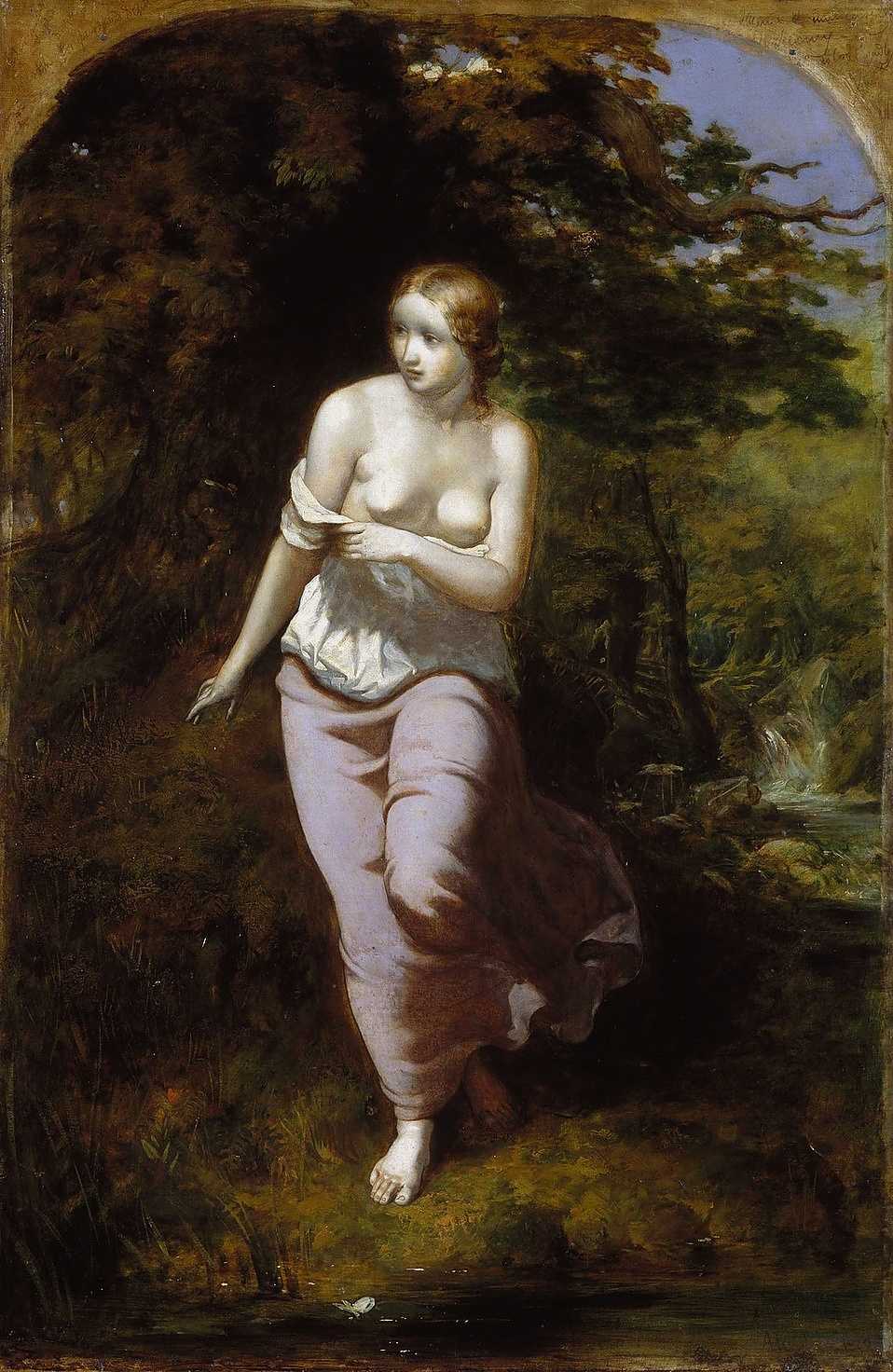
Musidora Bathing, 1849

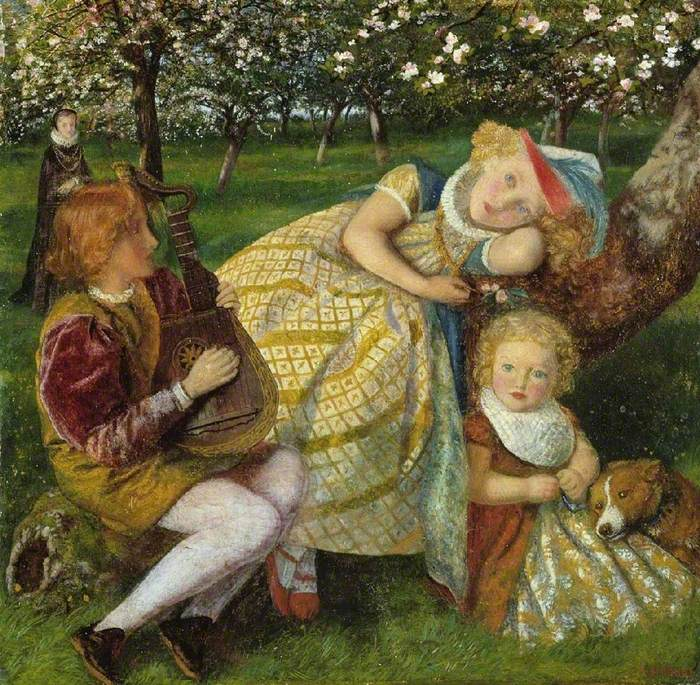
The King's Orchard

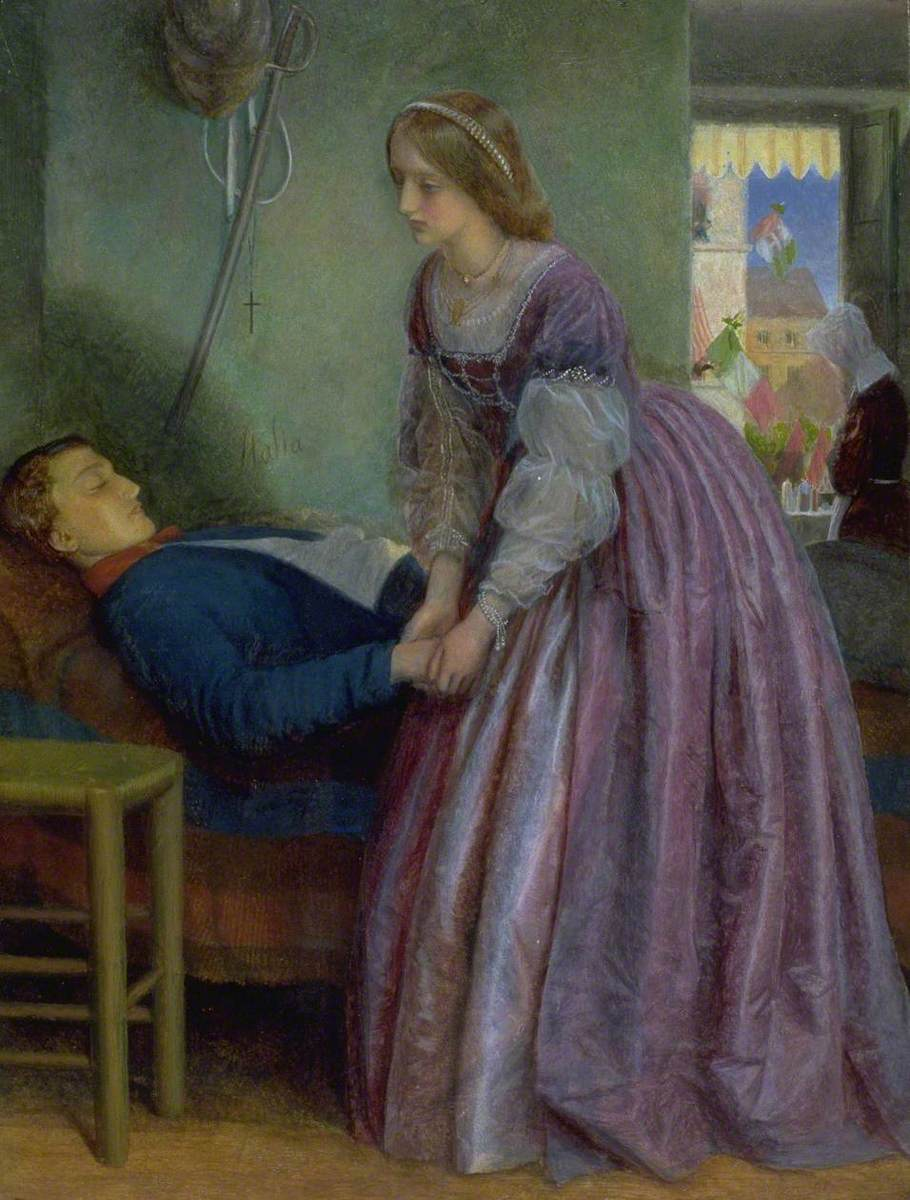
That was a Piedmontese ...

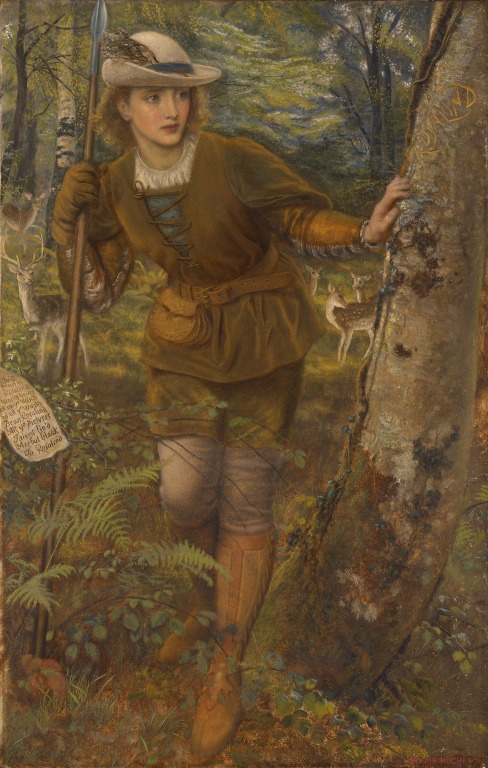
Rosalind in As You Like It

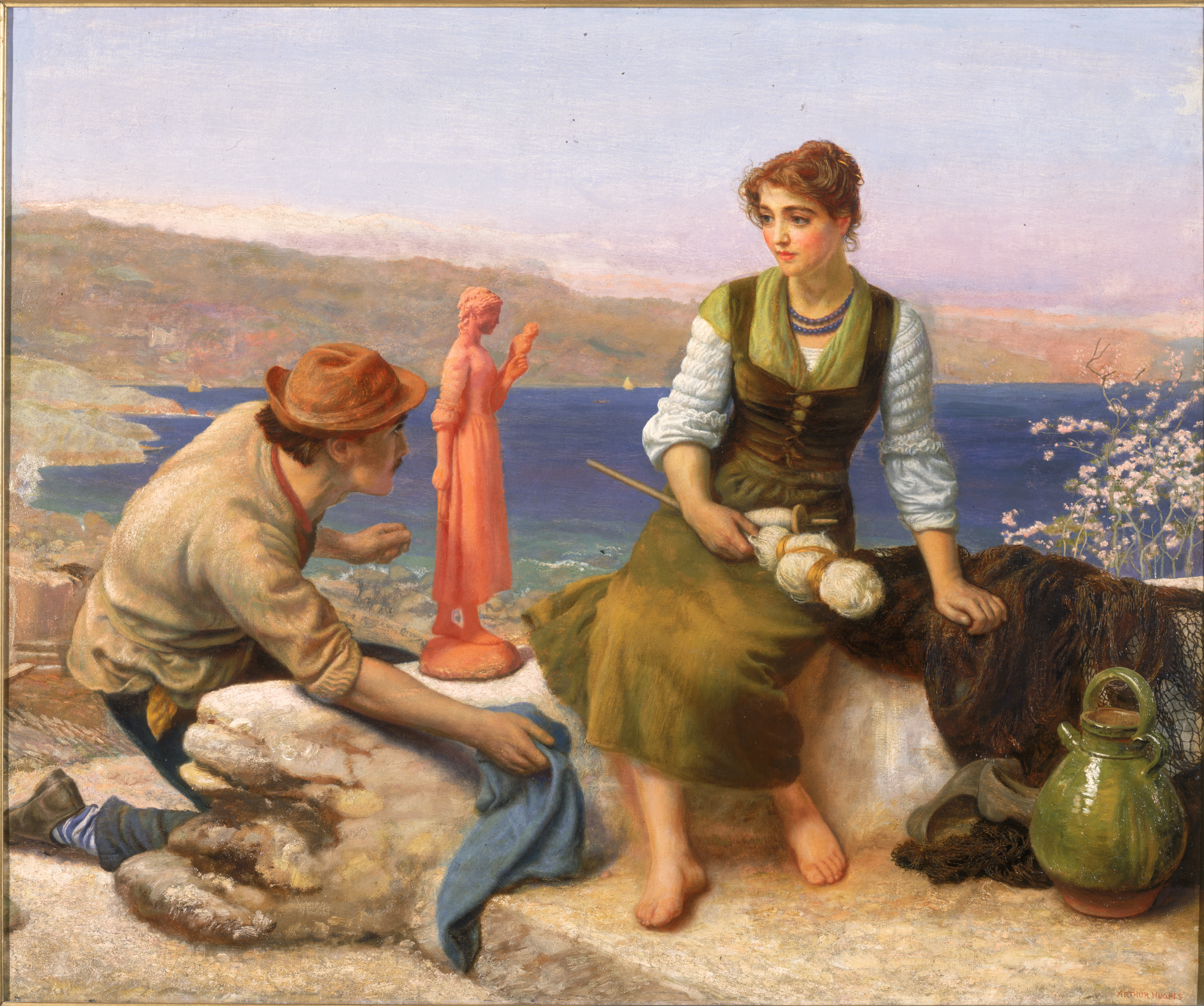
The Potter's Courtship

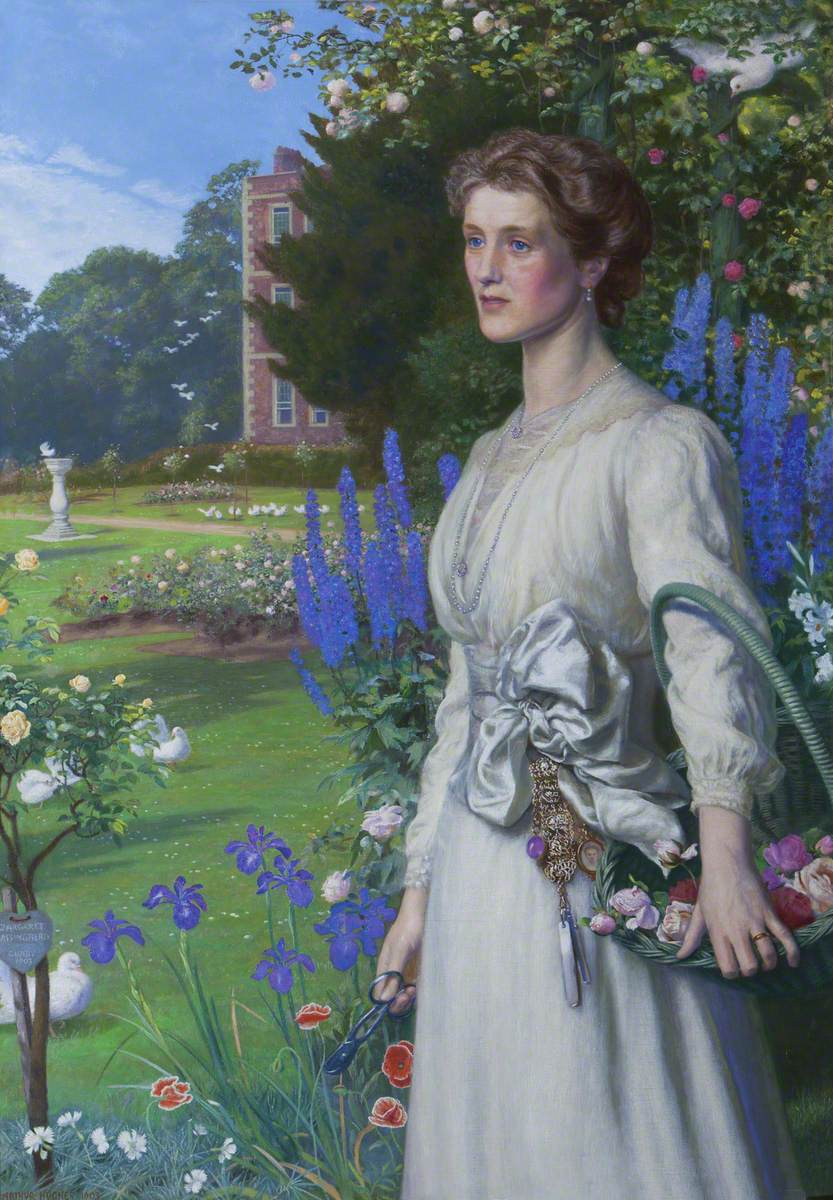
Margaret Lushington, Mrs Stephen Langton Massingberd

== See also ==
- List of Pre-Raphaelite paintings - includes catalogue of Hughes's work with links to individual paintings' articles.
- List of British painters
