= Musidora Bathing =

Painting by Arthur Hughes

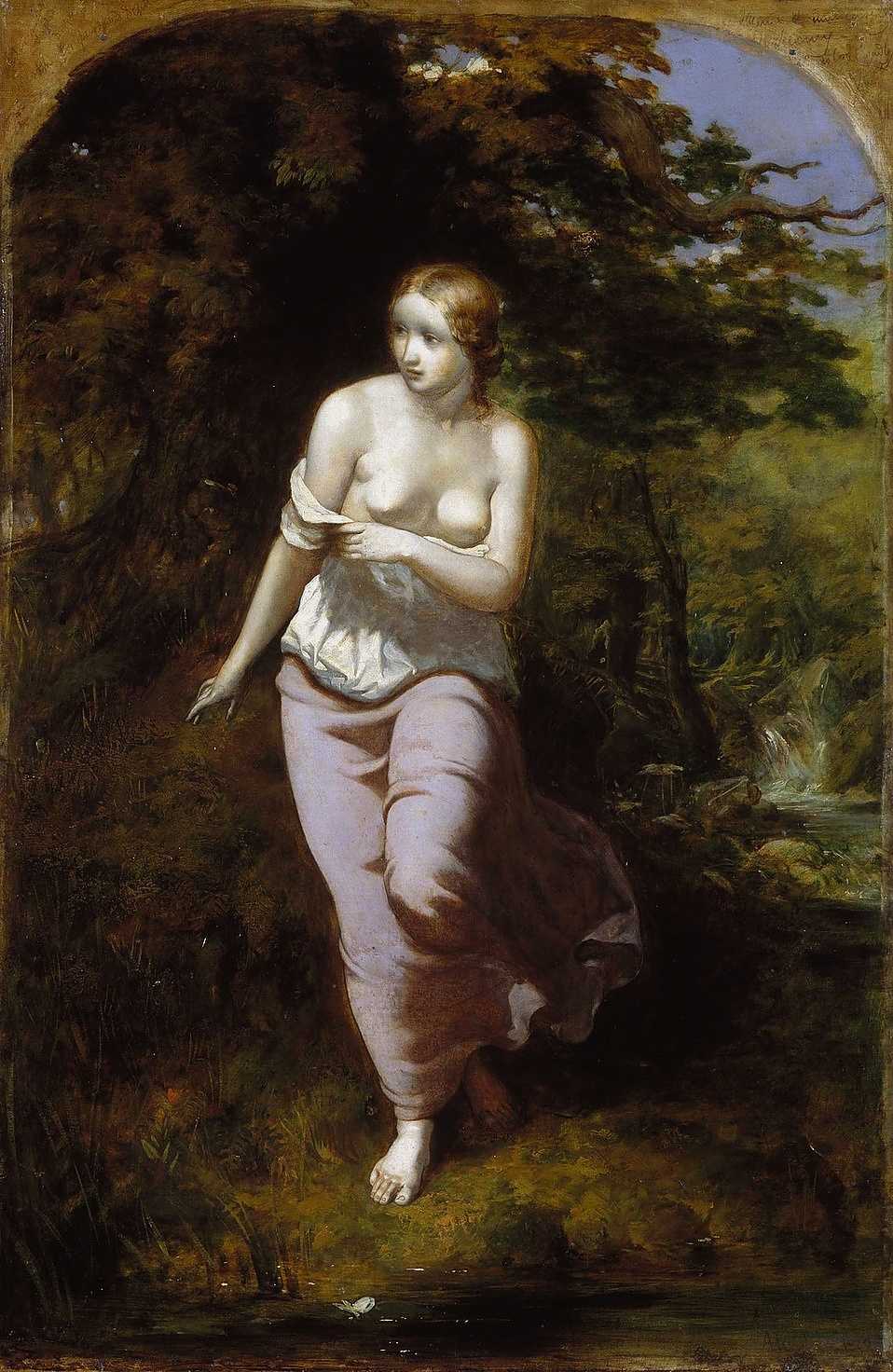
- Artist: Arthur Hughes
- Year: 1849
- Medium: Oil on canvas, genre painting
- Dimensions: 83.8 cm × 56 cm (33.0 in × 22 in)
- Location: Birmingham Museum and Art Gallery; Birmingham

Musidora Bathing is an 1849 oil painting by the British artist Arthur Hughes. It depicts a scene inspired by the poem Summer by the Scottish writer James Thomson. In it a young woman Musidora is surprised while bathing nude in a river, and looks up startled. Musidora was a popular subject in British art and had been portrayed by Thomas Gainsborough and William Etty amongst others.

Hughes was associated with the Pre-Raphaelite movement that emerged in the middle of the nineteenth century. He produced the painting at the age of seventeen and made his debut with it at the Royal Academy's Summer Exhibition of 1849 at the National Gallery in London. Today the painting is now on the collection of the Birmingham Museum Trust, having been acquired by the city in 1935.

== Bibliography ==
- De la Sizeranne, Robert. The Pre-Raphaelites. Parkstone International, 2023.
- Gaunt, William. The Restless Century: Painting in Britain, 1800–1900. Phaidon, 1972.
- Roberts, Leonard. Arthur Hughes: His Life and Works : a Catalogue Raisonné. Antique Collectors' Club, 1997.
- Roe, Sonia. Oil Paintings in Public Ownership in Birmingham. Public Catalogue Foundation, 2008.
- Smith, Alison. The Victorian Nude: Sexuality, Morality, and Art. Manchester University Press, 1996.
