= Arthur Foord Hughes =

English painter (1856–1934)

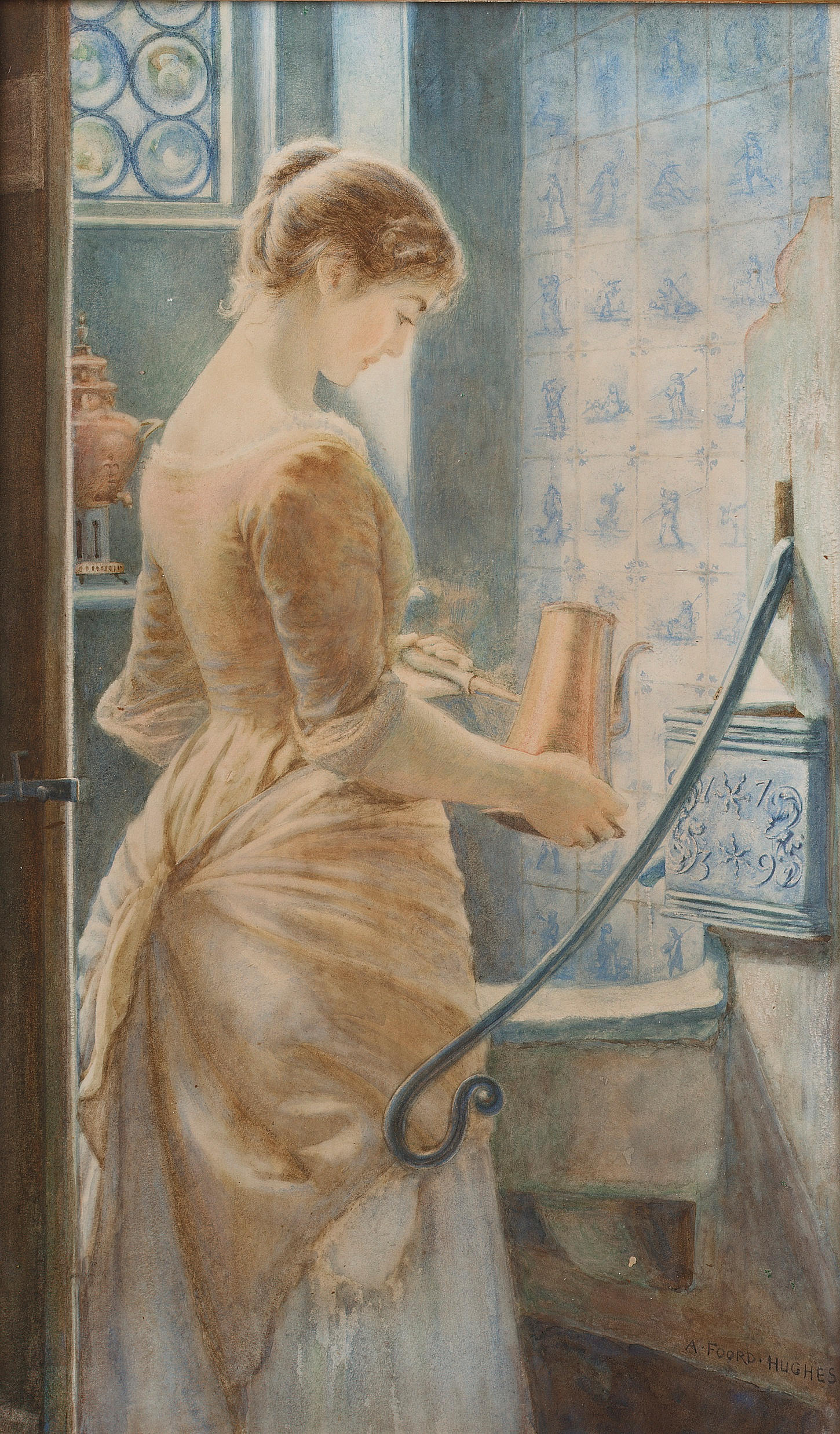
- Below Stairs. Signed A. Foord-Hughes. Watercolour. 45.5 x 28 cm
- Born: 1856; Pimlico, London, England
- Died: 20 July 1934 (aged 77–78); Hastings, Sussex, England
- Occupation: Painter
- Spouse: Elizabeth Jones
- Parents: Arthur Hughes; Tryphena Foord, (mother)

Arthur Foord Hughes (1856 – 20 July 1934) was an English genre and landscape artist.

Hughes was born in Pimlico, London, England, the son of the Pre-Raphaelite painter Arthur Hughes, and his wife and former model, Tryphena Foord. He was the cousin of Edward Robert Hughes, also an artist.

A page containing four figure studies, made by Dante Gabriel Rossetti in 1857, including one of Hughes as a baby, is in the collection of Birmingham Museum and Art Gallery. He was also the model for the title character in his father's illustrations for Tom Brown's School Days.

He had four siblings, including a sister, Emily, who survived him. He is buried at Hastings Cemetery.

His works feature in several public collections, including Ringmer Windmill (late 19th century watercolour) and Bexhill Downs Mill (c. 1900) at Brighton Museum & Art Gallery.

== Selected works ==
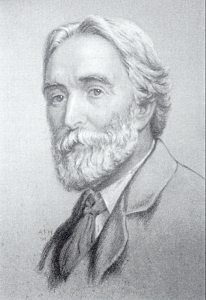
Arthur Hughes (1832–1915)

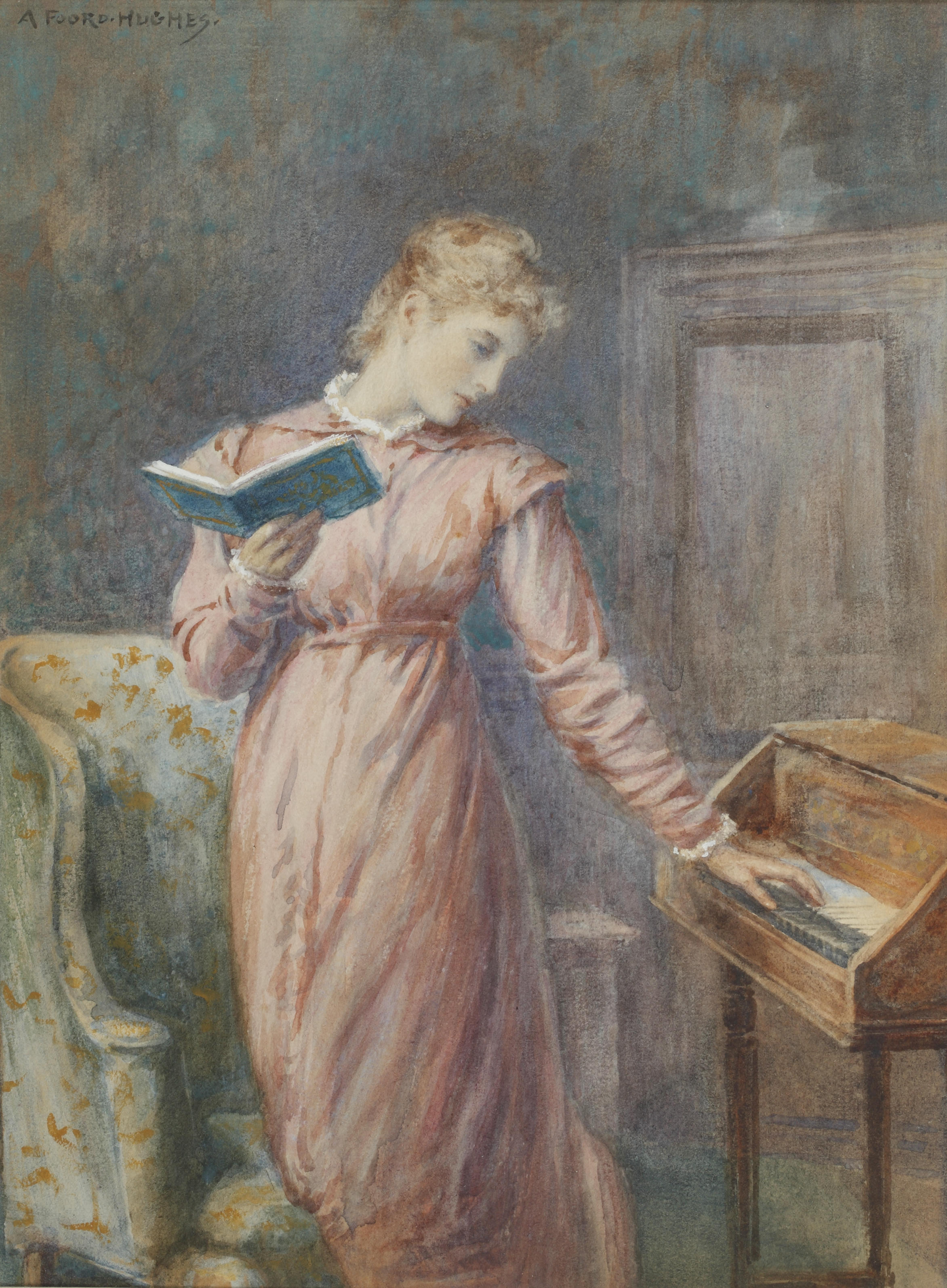
A lady reading while playing the spinet
