= Edward Robert Hughes =

British artist (1851–1914)

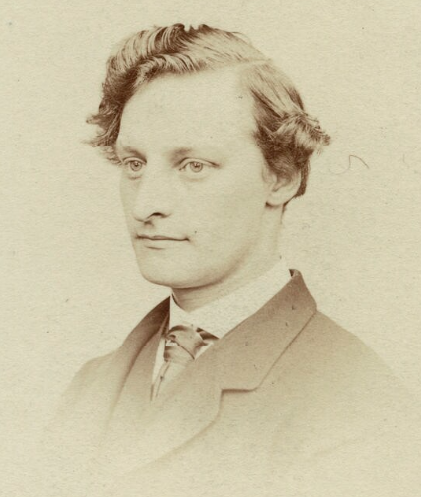
- Hughes in 1870
- Born: 5 November 1851; Clerkenwell, London, U.K.
- Died: 23 April 1914 (aged 62); St Albans, Hertfordshire, U.K.
- Education: Heatherleys; Royal Academy Schools; Arthur Hughes (uncle); William Holman Hunt; Arthur Foord Hughes; George MacDonald
- Known for: oil painting
- Movement: Pre-Raphaelitism
- Spouses: Mary MacDonald (m. 1874; death 1878) Emily Eliza Davies (m. 1883)
- Family: William Arthur Hughes (nephew)

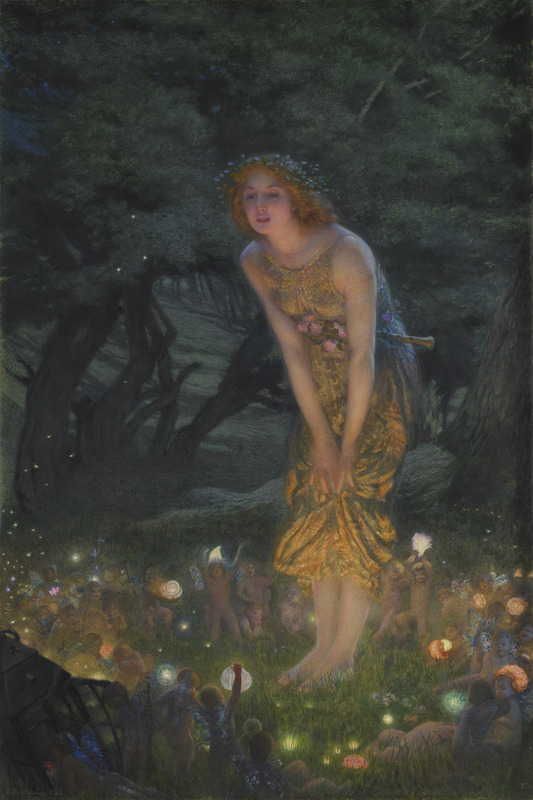
Midsummer Eve, c. 1908

Edward Robert Hughes RWS (5 November 1851 – 23 April 1914) was a British painter, who primarily worked in watercolours, but also produced a number of oil paintings. He was influenced by his uncle and artist, Arthur Hughes who was associated with the Pre-Raphaelite Brotherhood, and worked closely with one of the Brotherhood's founders, William Holman Hunt.

== Work ==
Having settled on his career choice, Edward Robert Hughes attended Heatherleys in London to prepare himself for the chance of entering the Royal Academy Schools. Hughes became a student at the Royal Academy School in 1868. While Pre-Raphaelitism played an influential part in shaping Hughes work, Aestheticism is also seen in his paintings.

E. R. Hughes is best known for his fantastical watercolours such as Midsummer Eve and Night with her Train of Stars, yet initially he built a career as a portrait painter to the upper classes.

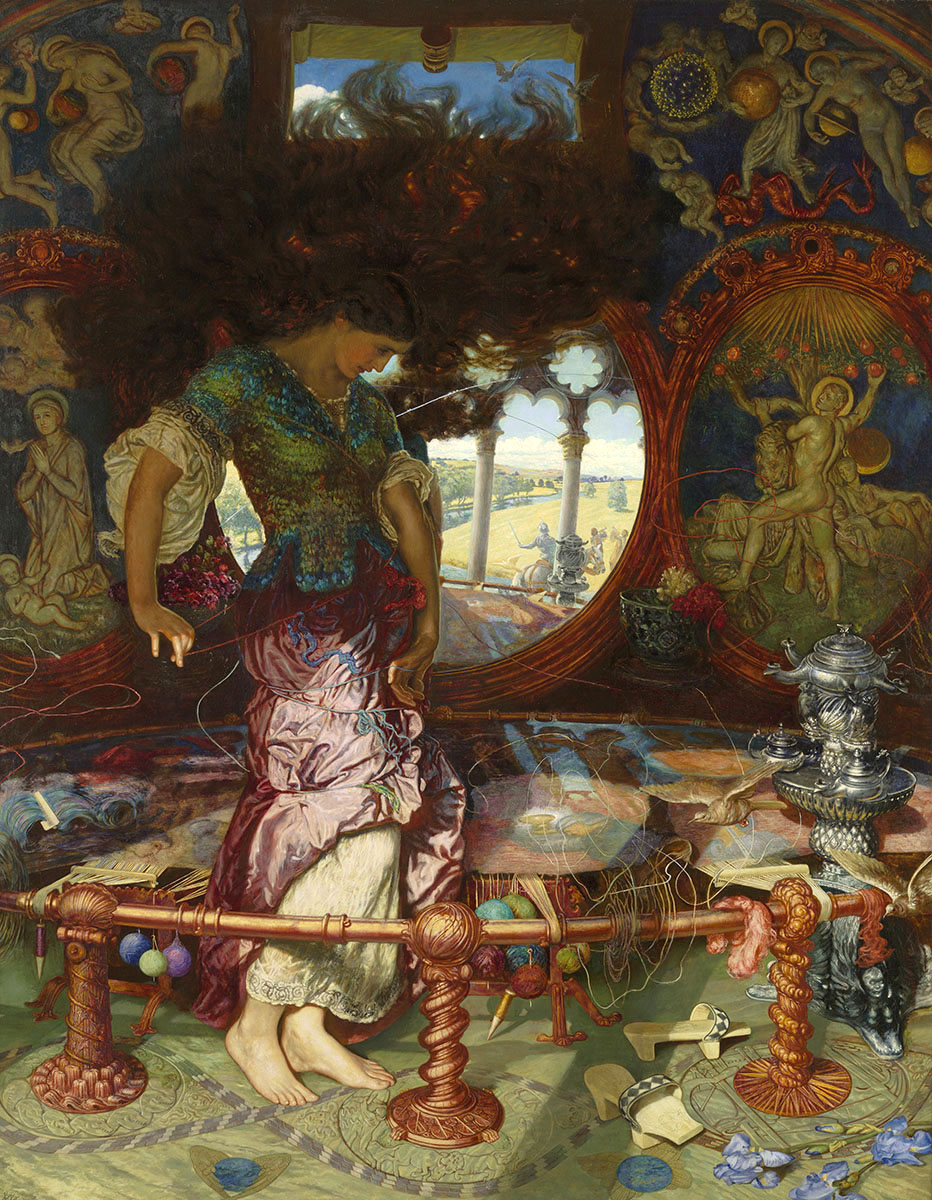
Holman Hunt's Lady of Shalott, 1889–1892, with the assistance of Hughes.

In addition to being an artist himself, E. R. Hughes was also a studio assistant to the elder artist and Pre-Raphaelite Brotherhood founding member William Holman Hunt. In later life Hunt suffered from glaucoma, and Hughes made a substantial contribution to a number of Hunt's paintings. Two of the paintings that Hughes worked on with Hunt were The Light of the World, which is displayed in St Paul's Cathedral, and The Lady of Shalott, which is exhibited at the Wadsworth Atheneum.

On his own he experimented with techniques and was a perfectionist; he did studies for many of his paintings, some of which turned out to be good enough for exhibition.

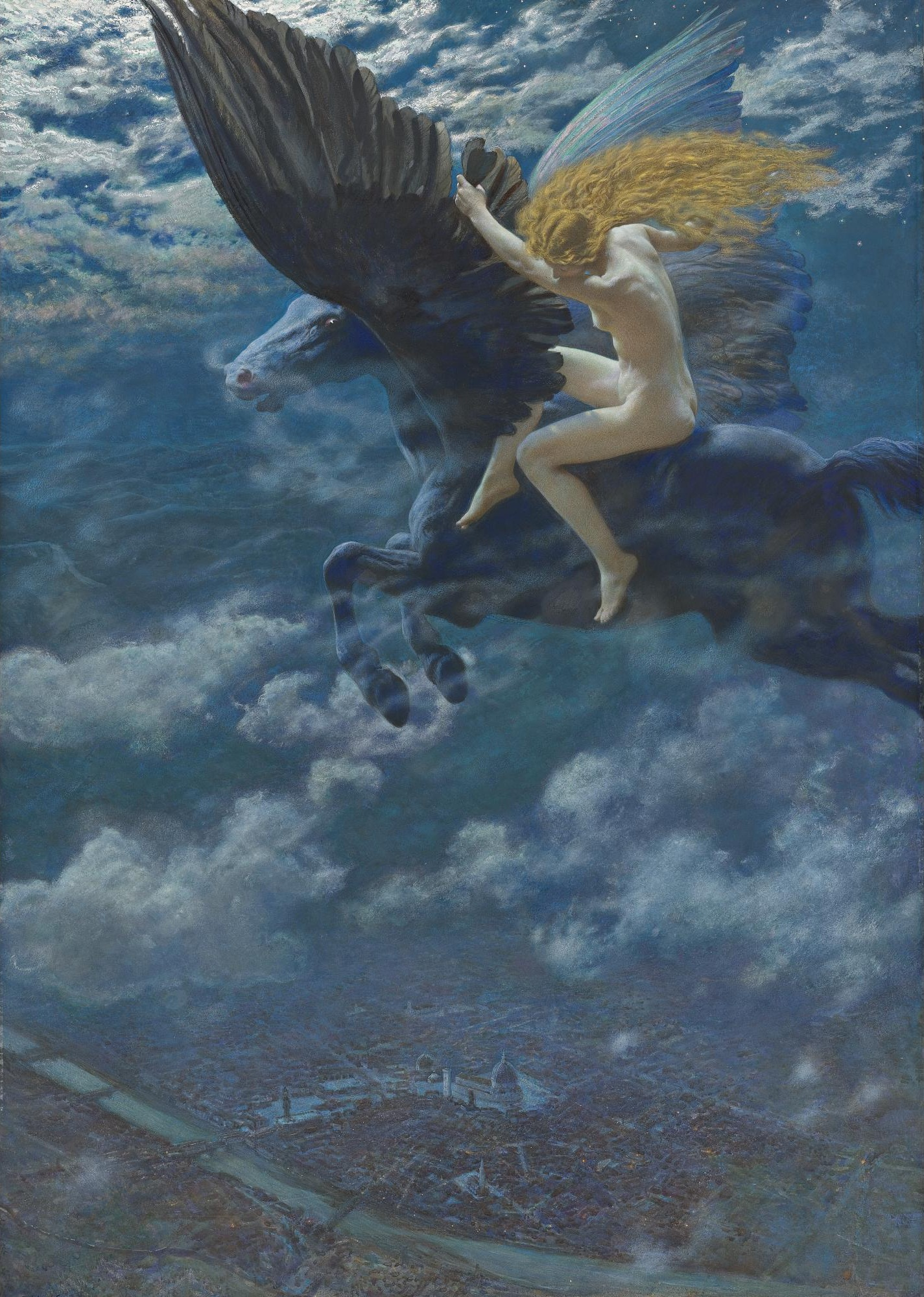
Dream Idyll (A Valkyrie), c. 1902

Hughes held several important offices within the artistic community over his lifetime, such as becoming a member of the Art Workers Guild in 1888, and was on their committee from 1895 to 1897. He was elected to Associate Membership of the Royal Watercolour Society (ARWS) on 18 February 1891, and he chose as his diploma work for election to full membership a mystical piece (Oh, What's That in the Hollow?) inspired by a verse by Christina Rossetti entitled Amor Mundi. His painting A Witch was given by the Royal Watercolour Society to King Edward VII and Queen Alexandra to mark the coronation in 1902. This work is based on his illustration entitled The Demon transporting Isabella to Ortodosia in W. G. Waters's The Italian Novelists published in 1901. In later years Hughes served as the Vice-President of the RWS before leaving in 1903.Throughout his career, E. R. Hughes exhibited his works in several galleries around London: Dudley Gallery, Grosvenor Gallery, New Gallery, The Royal Academy, and toward the end of his career he exhibited with The Royal Society of Painters in Water Colours (RWS).

His works can be seen in public collections including Cartwright Hall, Bradford, Cambridge & County Folk Museum, Maidstone Museum & Art Gallery, Bruce Castle Museum, Kensington Central Library, Birmingham Museum and Art Gallery, the Ashmolean Museum, Oxford, the Harris Museum & Art Gallery, Preston, and the National Trust for Scotland.

Birmingham Museums Trust staged a retrospective exhibition, Enchanted Dreams: The Pre-Raphaelite Art of E.R. Hughes, from 17 October 2015 to 21 February 2016 at Birmingham Museum and Art Gallery.

His auction record is $866,500 (£522,366) for Dream Idyll (A Valkyrie), sold at Sotheby's (New York) on 22 October 2009.

== Family life ==
E. R. Hughes (known to his family as "Ted") was born in Clerkenwell, London, in 1851 to Edward Hughes Snr. and Harriet Foord. He had one brother, William Arthur Hughes, who was two years younger than him and became a frame maker (gilder) and, by 1891, a photographer. During the 1860s he lived for a time with his uncle Arthur Hughes and his family, which included his son Arthur Foord Hughes, also an artist. In 1874 Hughes became engaged to Mary MacDonald, the daughter of the writer George MacDonald. Unfortunately, Mary died four years later. In 1883 Hughes married Emily Eliza Davies. In 1913 they moved to St Albans, Hertfordshire, where he was later stricken with appendicitis. He died after surgery on 23 April 1914 in his home (no. 3 Romeland). The marriage did not produce any offspring.

== Gallery ==
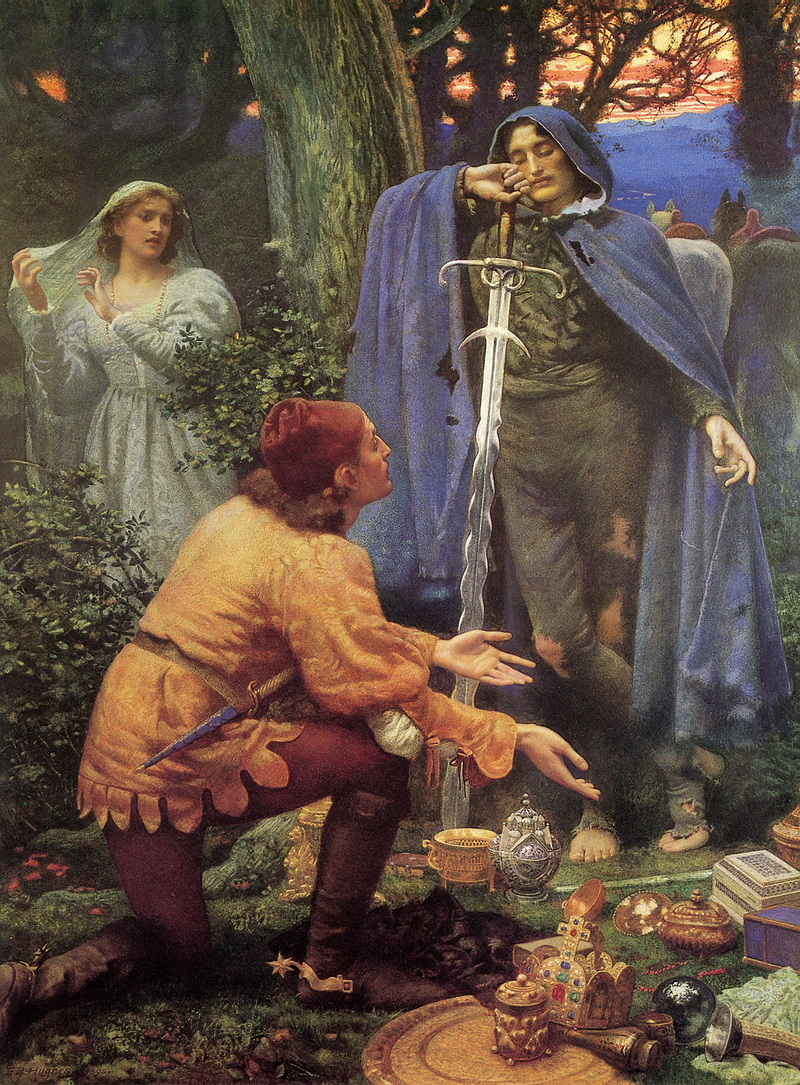
Bertuccio's Bride

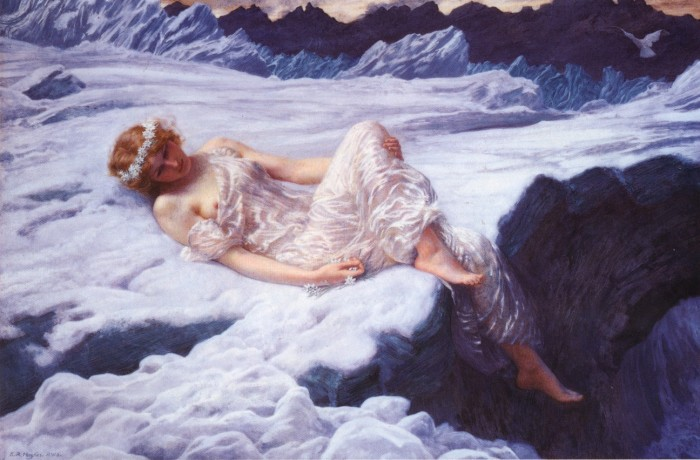
Heart of Snow

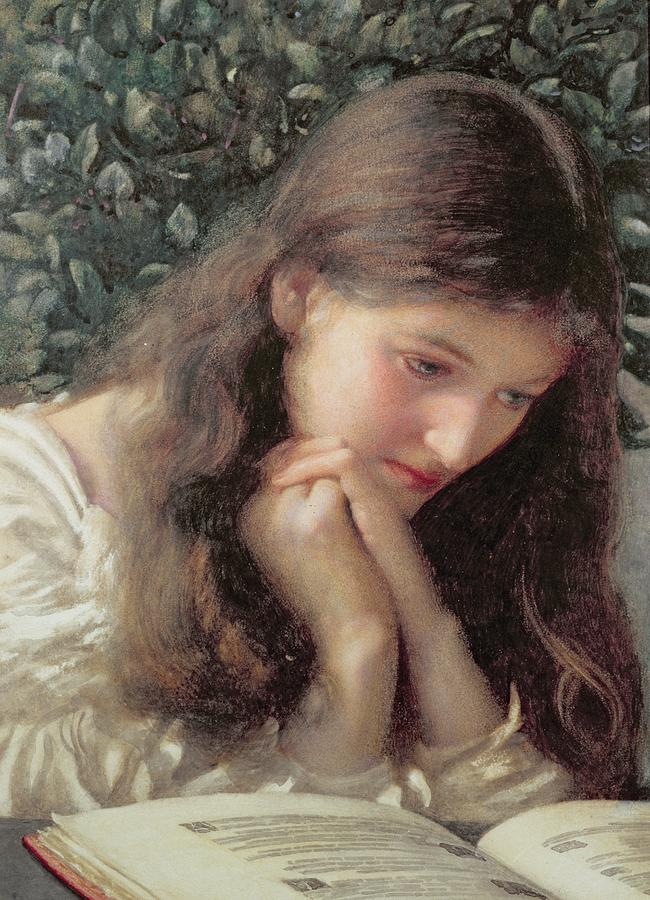
Idle Tears

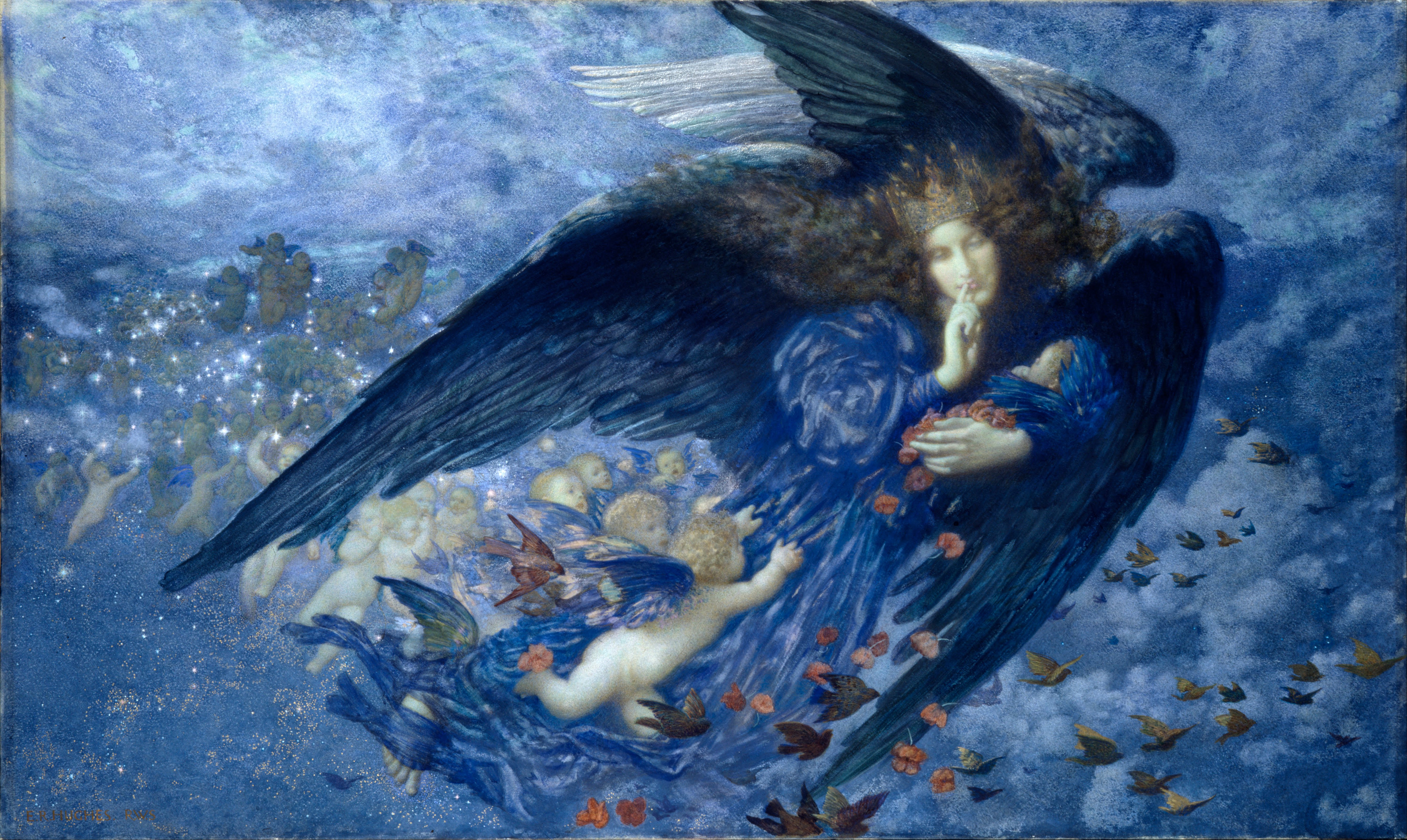
Night with her Train of Stars

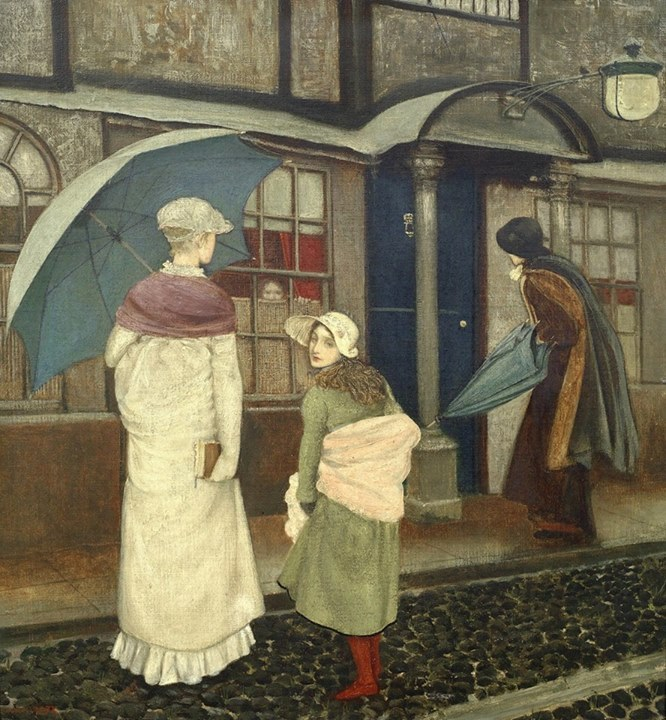
Sabbath Morn

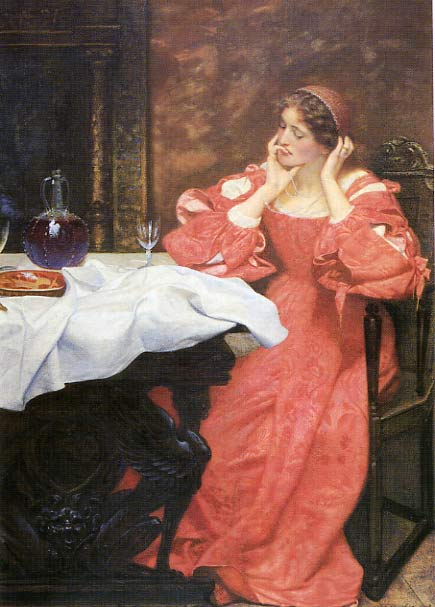
The Shrew Katherina

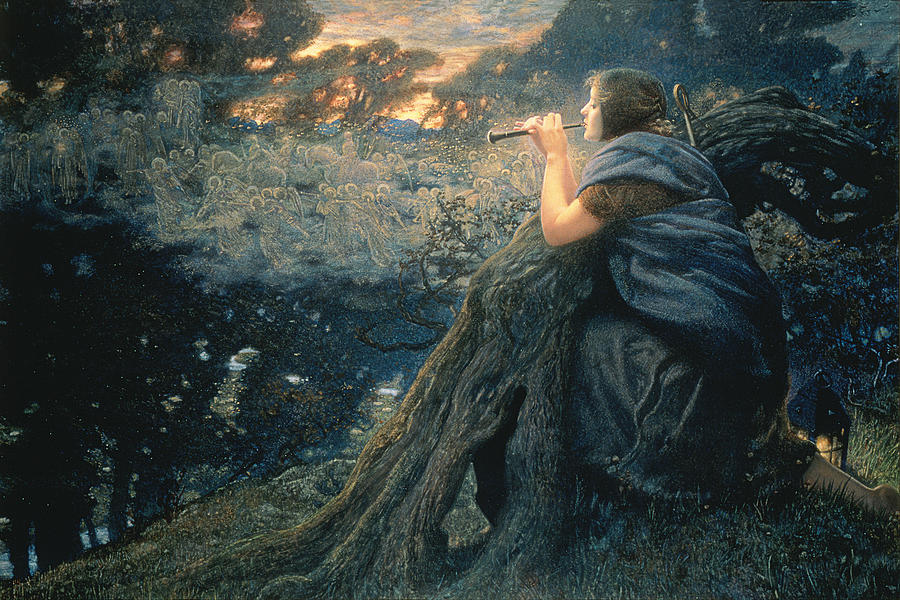
Summer Fantasy.

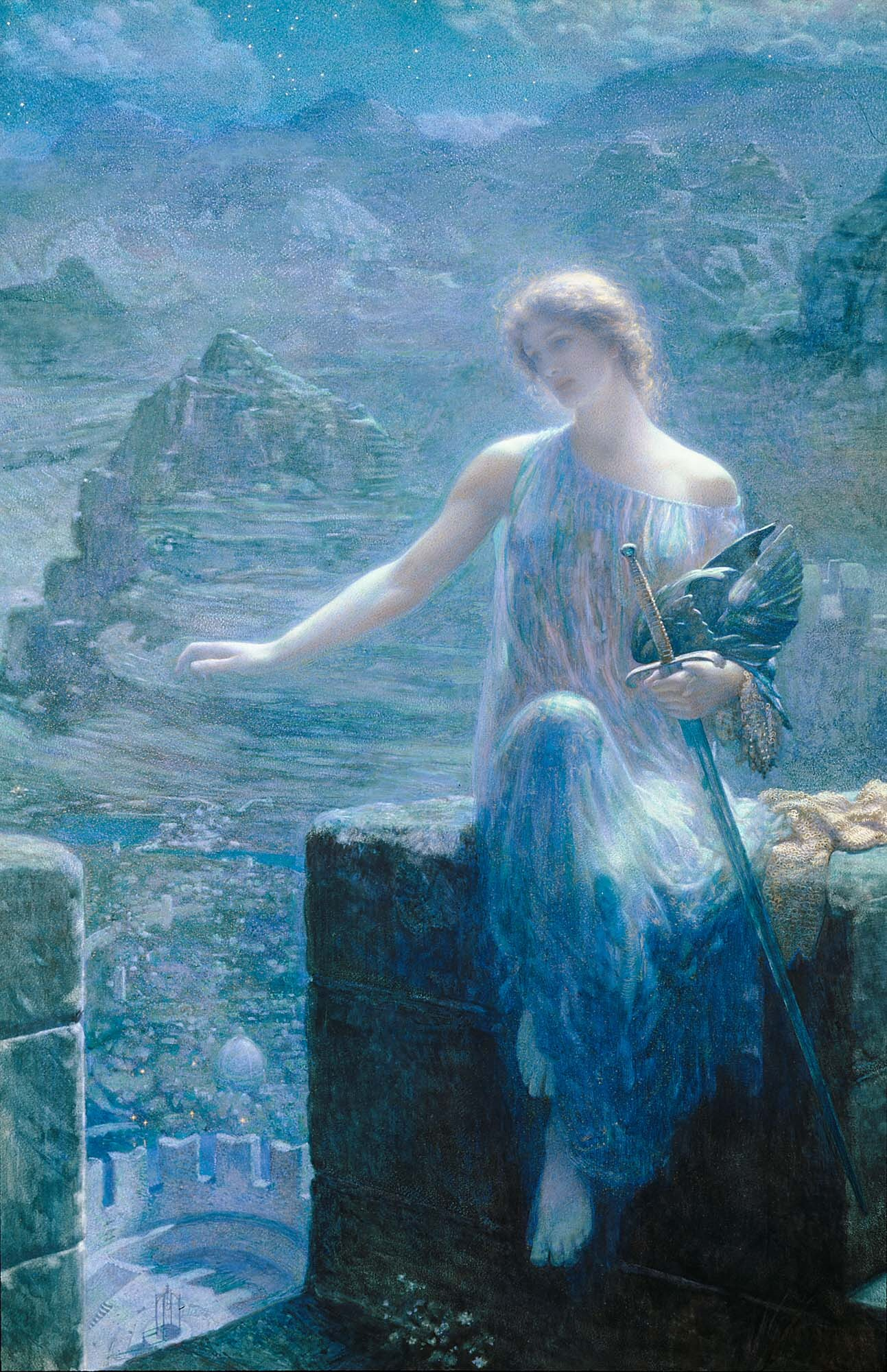
The Valkyrie's Vigil

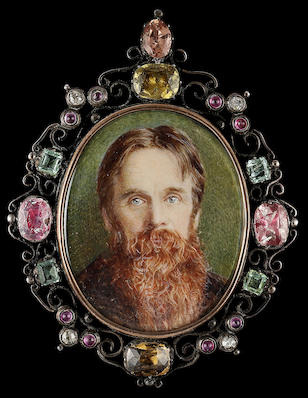
William Holman Hunt

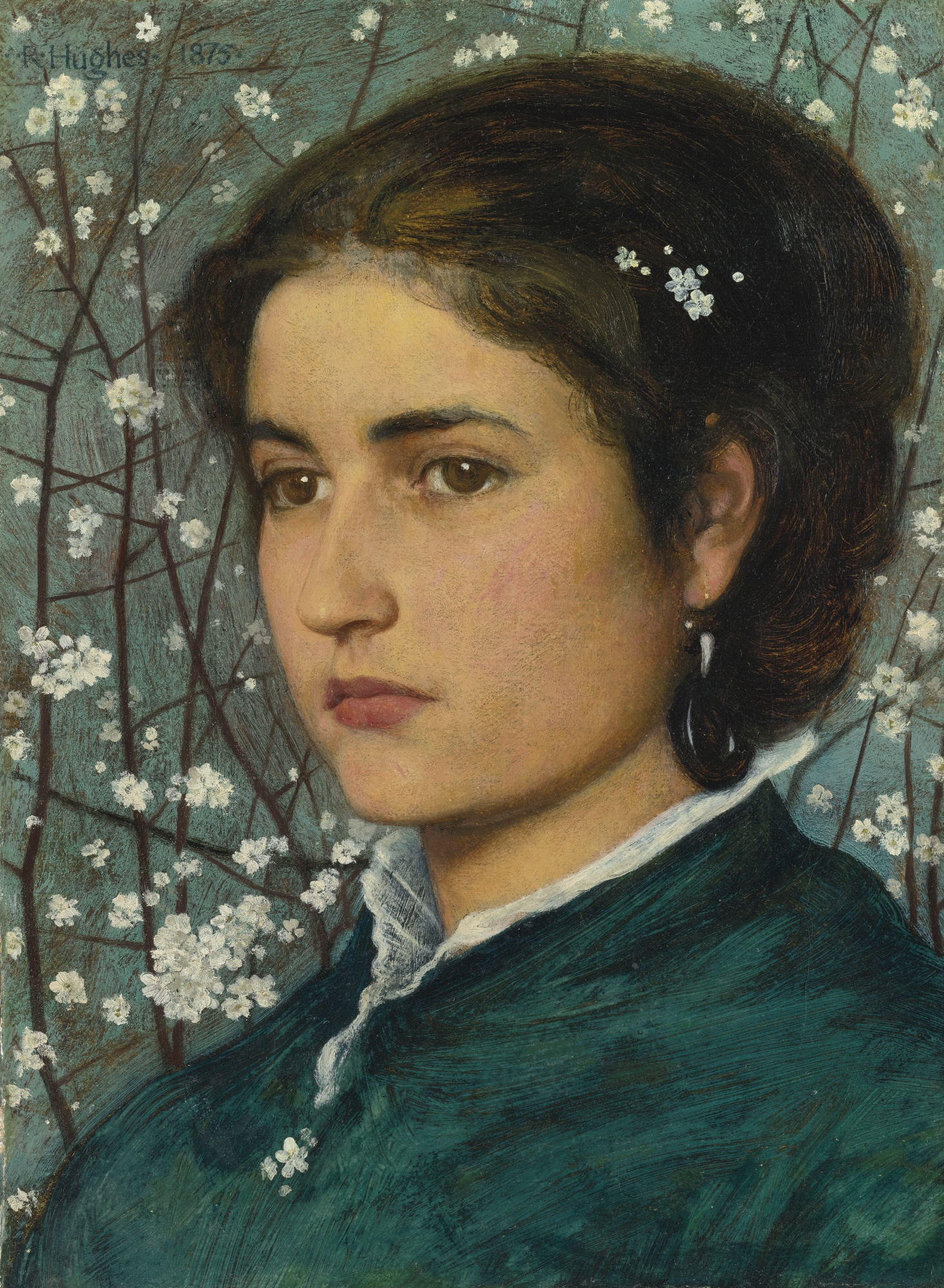
A Young Beauty

== See also ==
- List of Pre-Raphaelite paintings

== Bibliography ==
- Engen, Rodney (January 1990). The Twilight of Edward Robert Hughes RWS. Watercolours & Drawings.
- Osborne, Victoria Jean (2010). A British Symbolist in Pre-Raphaelite circles : Edward Robert Hughes RWS (M.Phil.). OCLC 729577738.
