= April Love (painting) =

1855-1856 painting by Arthur Hughes

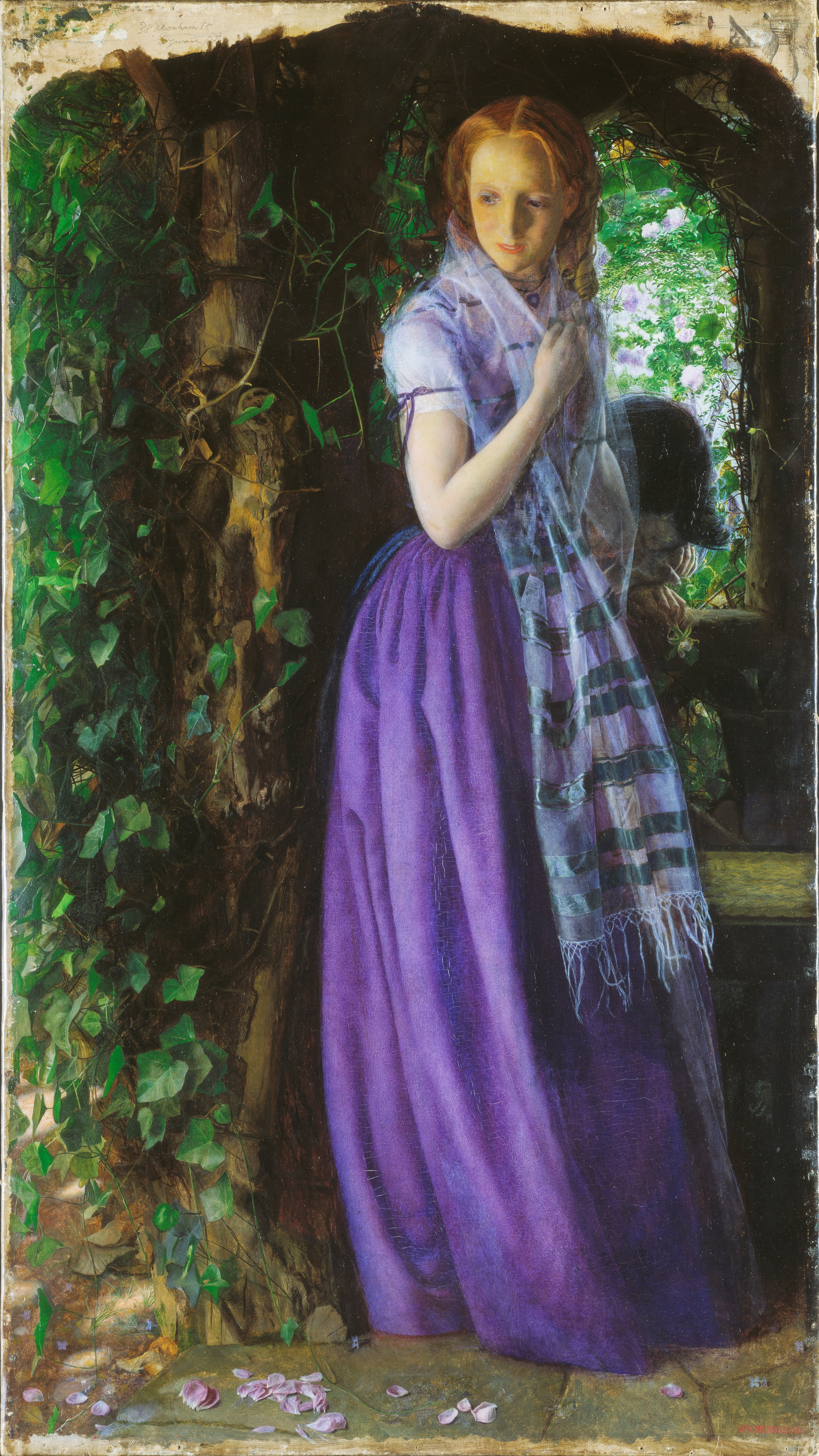
- Artist: Arthur Hughes
- Year: 1855–1856
- Medium: Oil on canvas
- Dimensions: 89 cm × 50 cm (35 in × 19.5 in)
- Location: Tate Britain, London

April Love is a painting by the Pre-Raphaelite painter Arthur Hughes which was created between 1855 and 1856. It was first exhibited at the Royal Academy of Arts in 1856.

At its first showing Hughes accompanied the painting with an extract from Tennyson's poem "The Miller's Daughter":

Love is hurt with jar and fret,
Love is made a vague regret,
Eyes with idle tears are set,
Idle habit links us yet;
What is Love? For we forget.
Ah no, no.

Originally acquired by William Morris, the painting was purchased by the Tate Gallery, London (now Tate Britain) in 1909 and has remained in the Tate collection to the present day.

The painting depicts a young couple at a moment of emotional crisis. The male figure is barely visible, his head bent over the young woman's left hand. The woman, tears slightly overflowing, is looking down at fallen blossoms, suggesting the end of spring and of early and young love.

The model for the principal figure was Tryphena Ford, whom Hughes married in 1855.
