= The Pot of Basil =

The Pot of Basil may refer to a story in The Decameron or works inspired by it:

- An important item in the fifth story on the fourth day; see Summary of Decameron tales#Fourth day
  - Isabella, or the Pot of Basil, 1818 poem by John Keats
  - Isabella and the Pot of Basil, 1868 painting by William Holman Hunt
  - Isabella (Millais painting), 1849 painting by John Everett Millais
