= Hugh Fenn =

Hugh Fenn may refer to:

- Hugh Fenn (died 1409), English official from Norfolk who served under Richard II and Henry IV
- Hugh Fenn (died 1476), English official from Norfolk who served under Henry VI and Edward IV
- The subject of John Everett Millais' 1848 painting Portrait of Hugh Fenn
