= Isabella (Millais painting) =

Painting by John Everet Millais

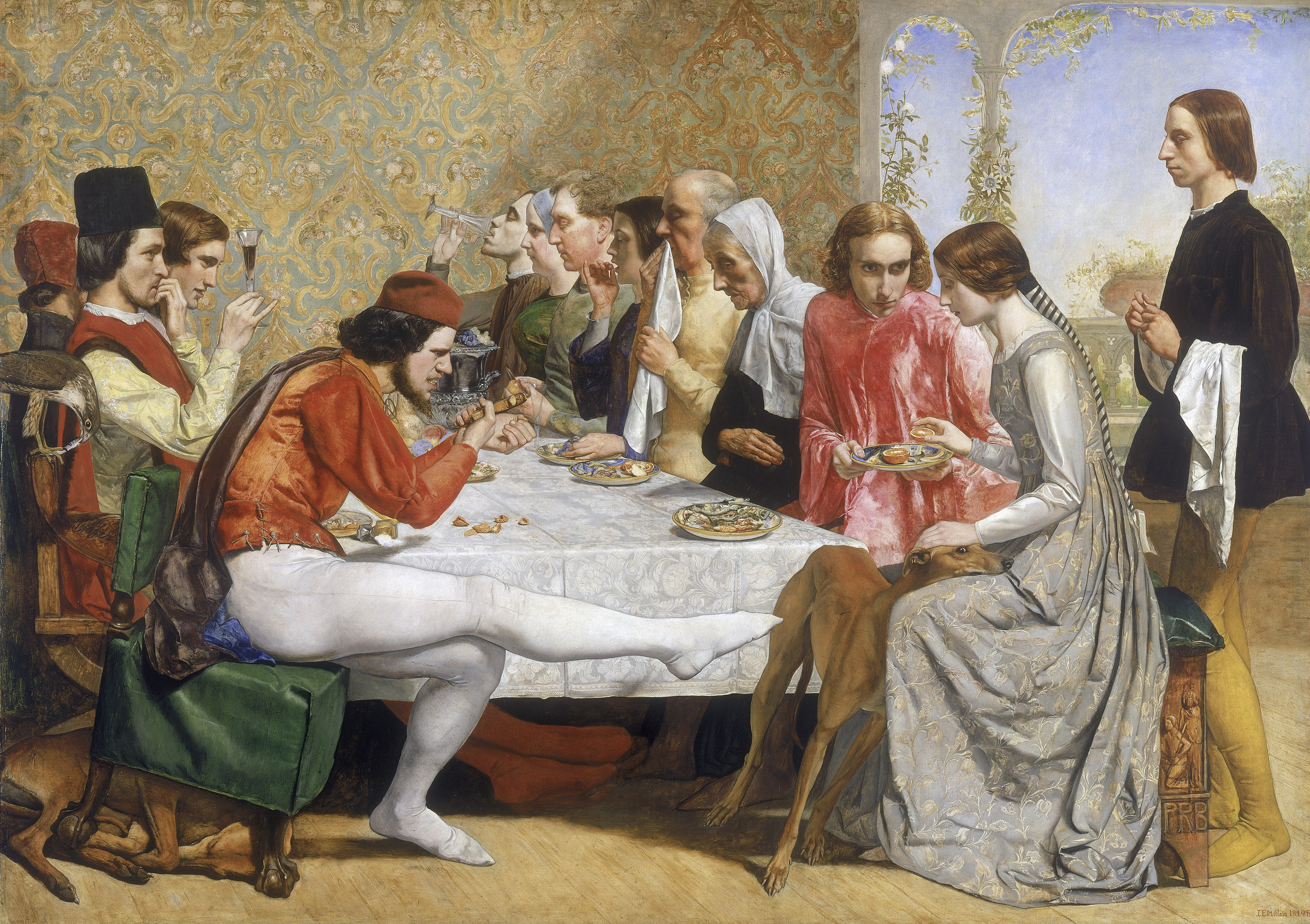
- Artist: John Everett Millais
- Year: 1848–1849
- Medium: Oil on canvas
- Dimensions: 103 cm × 142.8 cm (41 in × 56.2 in)
- Location: Walker Art Gallery, Liverpool

Isabella (1848–1849), also known as Lorenzo and Isabella, is a painting by John Everett Millais, which was his first exhibited work in the Pre-Raphaelite style, completed shortly after the formation of the Pre-Raphaelite Brotherhood in 1848. It was first exhibited at the Royal Academy in 1849, and is now in the collection of the Walker Art Gallery in Liverpool.

The painting illustrates an episode from Giovanni Boccaccio's Decameron novel Lisabetta e il testo di bassilico (1349–1353), which was reused for John Keats's poem, Isabella, or the Pot of Basil, which describes the relationship between Isabella, the sister of wealthy medieval merchants, and Lorenzo, an employee of Isabella's brothers. It depicts the moment at which Isabella's brothers realise that there is a romance between the two young people, and plot to murder Lorenzo so they can marry Isabella to a wealthy nobleman. Isabella, wearing grey at the right, is being handed a blood orange on a plate by the doomed Lorenzo. A cut blood orange is symbolic of the neck of someone who has just been decapitated, referring to Isabella cutting off Lorenzo's head to take it with her after finding him buried. One of her brothers violently kicks a frightened greyhound while cracking a nut.

== Context ==
Millais and his Pre-Raphaelite colleague William Holman Hunt had both produced drawings illustrating episodes from the poem, but only Millais worked his up into a full painting (Hunt's 1868 Isabella and the Pot of Basil used a completely different composition). Both drawings used distorted perspective and angular poses characteristic of medieval art, by which the Pre-Raphaelites were influenced. Millais also draws on the precedent of William Hogarth's satirical depictions of an arranged marriage Marriage à-la-mode.

As has been suggested by some, the figure of Isabella is probably inspired by that of the Duchess of Milan Beatrice d'Este, of whom Millais himself had just reproduced a drawing and from which he takes up the hairstyle of the coazzone (the long braid covered with cloth that falls behind the shoulders).

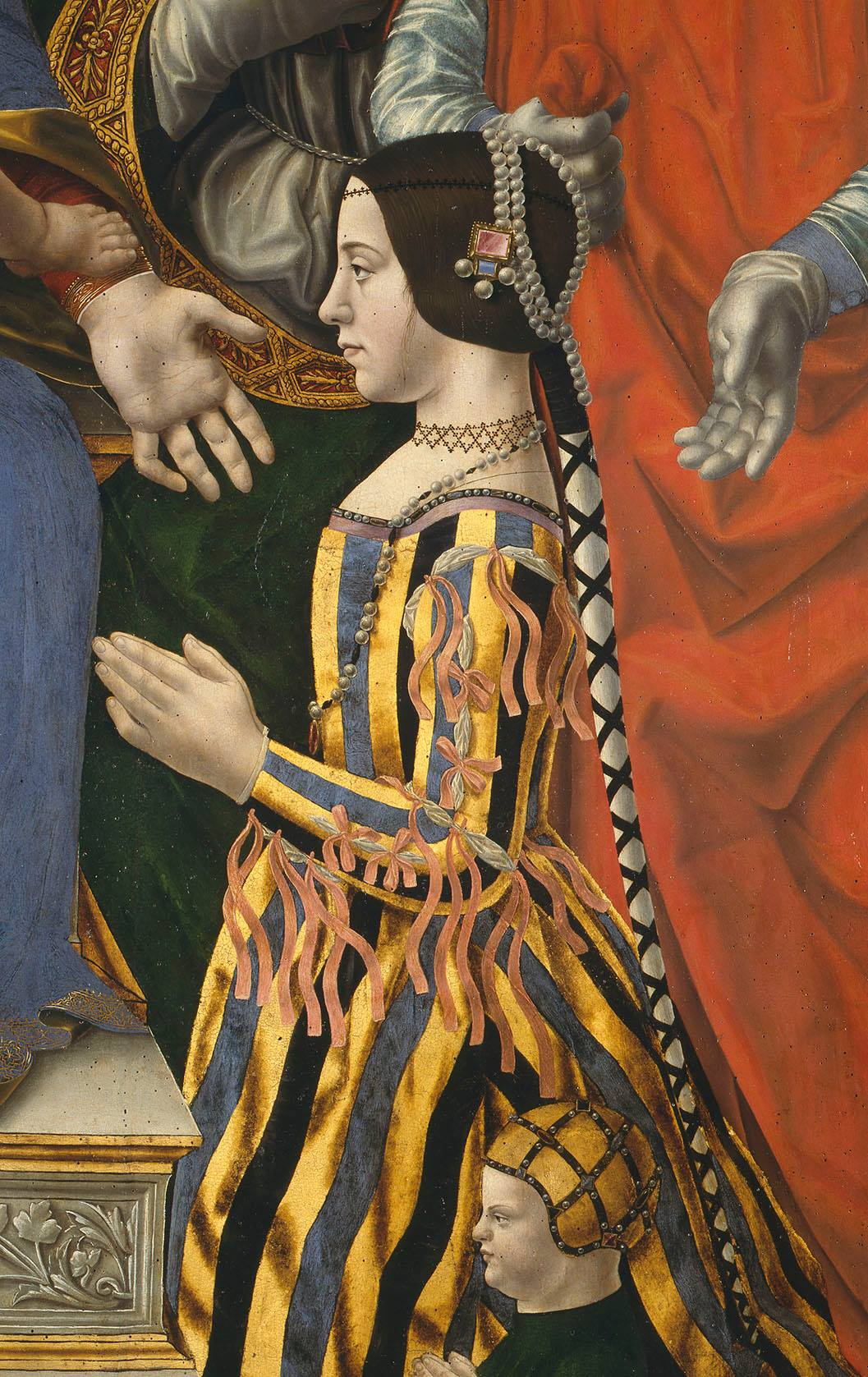
Beatrice d'Este in the Pala Sforzesca, a painting that Millais copied in watercolour in 1848

== Composition and meaning ==
External videos
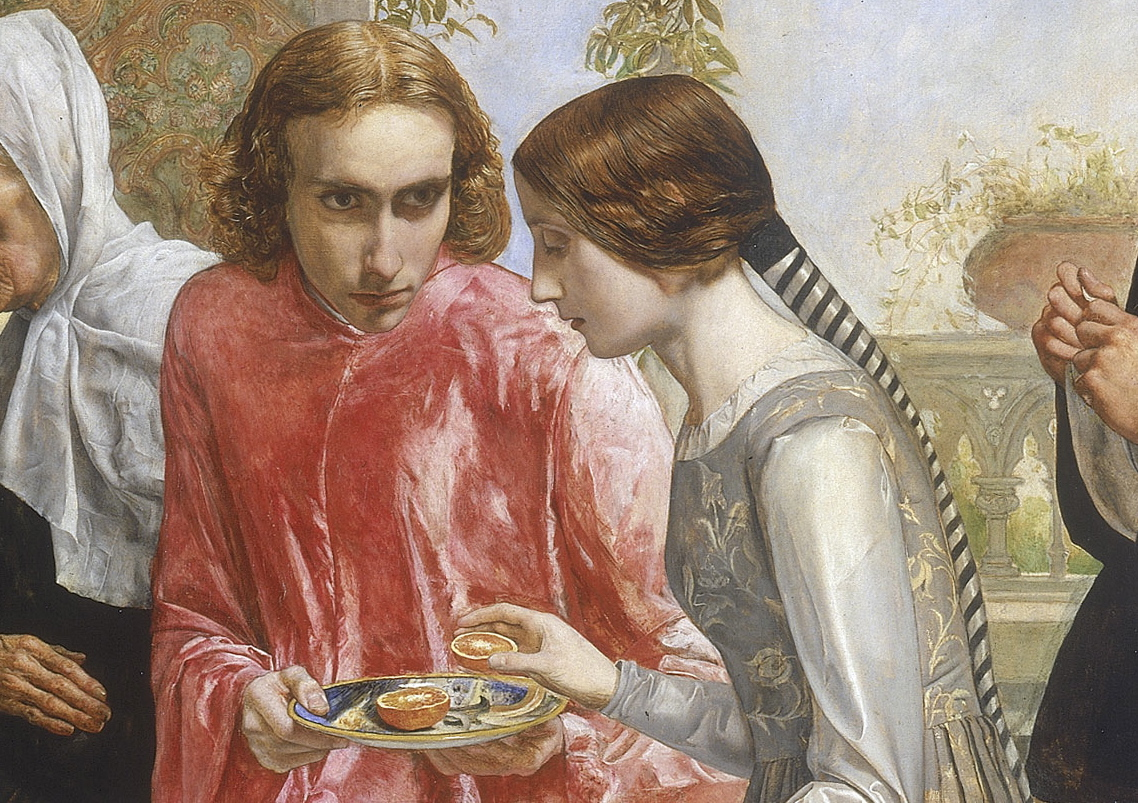
- Pre-Raphaelites: Curator's choice - Millais's Isabella, Tate Gallery

The painting is structured with deliberately distorted perspective, elongating the right hand side of the table and flattening the figures ranged along it. Following Pre-Raphaelite theory, Millais almost eliminates chiaroscuro and exaggerates the intensity of juxtaposed colours and tones - as evidenced in the flat black tunic set against the sharply modelled white cloth of the servant at the right, whose lower body virtually disappears as his yellow stockings semi-merge with the background.

Millais also carefully characterises each figure with equal precision. Another distinctive Pre-Raphaelite feature is the inclusion of images and patterns within the image as a whole. Each of the plates has a distorted picture glazed into its surface. The base of the bench on which Isabella sits contains a carving depicting a kneeling figure under which appear the letters PRB (standing for Pre-Raphaelite Brotherhood).

The central motif of the thuggish brother's kicking leg and upturned chair further disturbs the equilibrium of the composition, as does the deliberately confusing "crowding" of the figures on the table and elaboration of motifs.

== Hidden phallic symbols ==
In 2012, British art curator Carol Jacobi published an article about sexual symbols in the painting. They were all on or near the character in the front left, who is stretching out his leg and using a nutcracker. The shadow on the table near his crotch area, his leg, and the nutcracker were all argued to represent a phallus. Jacobi said: "The shadow is clearly phallic, and it also references the sex act, with the salt tipped into the shadow." She also argued that it would have been deliberate, but did not know what the painter's intention with it was. However, she stated that it was "not a Freudian slip, or a hypocritical, furtive innuendo. The imagery of masturbation and the anxieties around it and being unable to control yourself sexually would have been well known."

== Models ==
The man third from the back on the right-hand side, peeling an apple, is William Hugh Fenn, who had previously sat for Millais' Portrait of Hugh Fenn (October 1848). The profile face at the back of the left-hand side is thought to be his friend, the painter Walter Deverell.

== Adaptation ==
Sam Walsh (1934–1989) painted The Dinner Party in 1980. It is one of his most complex works and is inspired by Millais' Pre-Raphaelite painting Isabella. Both paintings are in the Walker Art Gallery at Liverpool. In this interpretation, the sitters, who would never have met all at the same time, are people from all periods of its life.

== See also ==
- List of paintings by John Everett Millais
