= The Germ (periodical) =

Pre-Raphaelite periodical

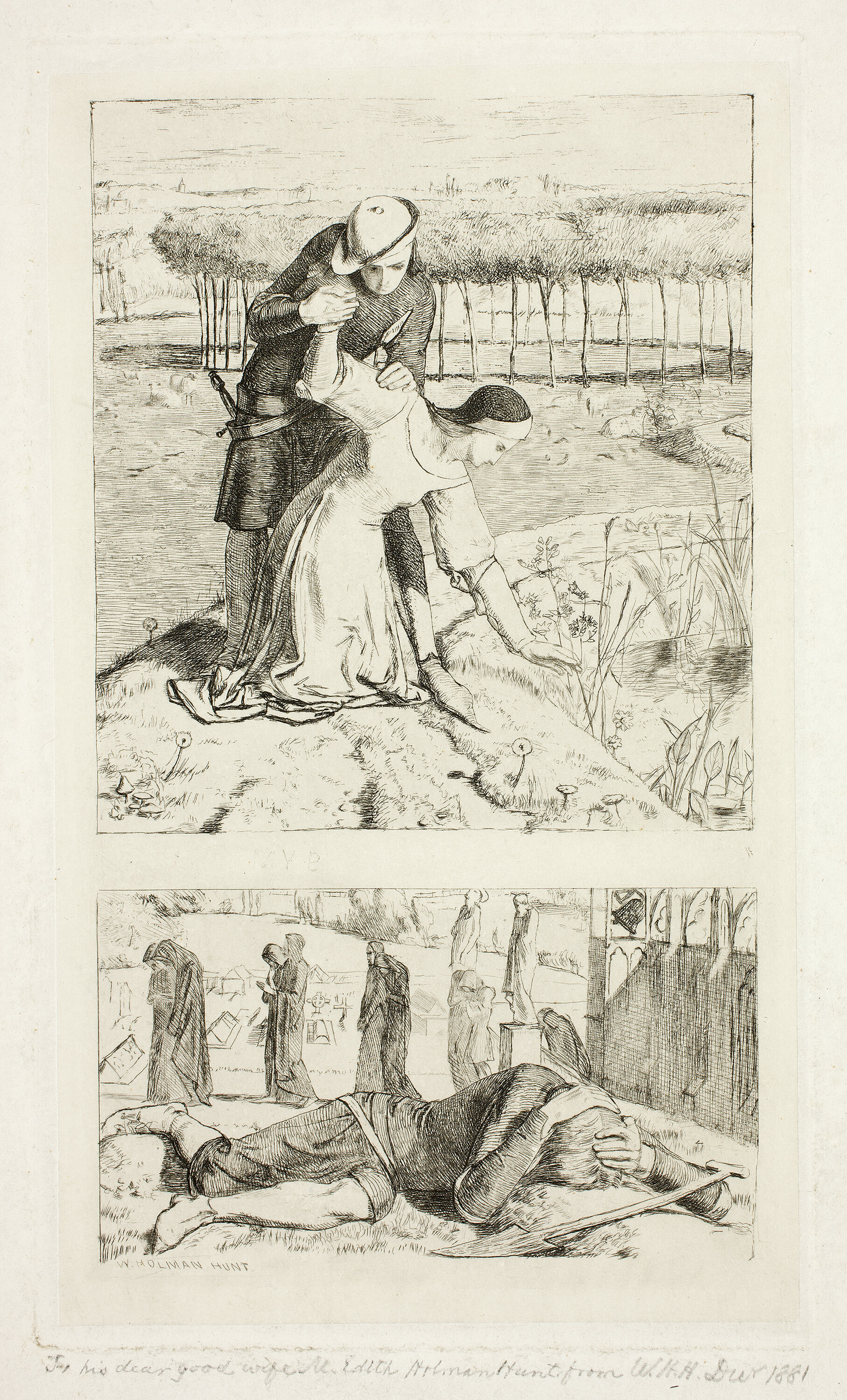
Illustration by Holman Hunt to Thomas Woolner's poem "My Beautiful Lady", published in The Germ, 1850

The Germ, thoughts towards nature in art and literature (1850) was a periodical established by the Pre-Raphaelite Brotherhood to disseminate their ideas. The magazine was edited by William Michael Rossetti. The Germ was renamed Art and Poetry, being Thoughts towards Nature, conducted principally by Artists for its last two issues. It was not a success, only surviving for four issues between January and April 1850.

Illustrations were provided by members of the brotherhood. Every issue began with an original etching. William Holman Hunt provided an illustration to Woolner's poem My Beautiful Lady in the first issue. Collinson illustrated his own poem, The Child Jesus, in the second issue. Madox Brown created a two-page illustration of the King Lear and his daughters for the third issue, accompanying his article on the mechanics of a history painting. Walter Deverell depicted Viola and Olivia from Shakespeare's Twelfth Night in the last issue.

The Germ published poetry by William Michael Rossetti and other members of the Brotherhood including William Michael Rossetti's brother Dante Gabriel Rossetti, Thomas Woolner and James Collinson. Christina Rossetti also had her poetry published there. It also printed contributions of verse and essays on art and literature by associates of the Brotherhood including Ford Madox Brown and Coventry Patmore, as well as occasional book reviews.

== Title ==
The title The Germ refers to the Pre-Raphaelite belief in the importance of nature (a germ is a seed) and of the human imagination, as implied by the phrase "the germ of an idea". They hoped that the magazine would be a seed from which new creative ideas would grow. It was subtitled thoughts towards nature in art and literature to emphasise the editors' belief that poetry and art should be closely intertwined.

In the hope of improving the magazine's poor sales, it was renamed with the less ambiguous title Art and Poetry, being Thoughts towards Nature, conducted principally by Artists for its final two issues. Each issue sold less than 100 copies and the magazine closed in May 1850.

== Editions ==
The Germ was printed by Messrs. Tupper and Sons, a firm of lithographic and general printers in the City of London, who took a financial stake in the publication to try to ensure its success; the Tupper family had links to the Brotherhood through the sculptor John Lucas Tupper. Only 70 of the first issue of 700 copies were sold. The print run was reduced for the next edition, but sales did not pick up. George Tupper persuaded the group to carry on for two more issues, but ultimately bore the brunt of the financial losses.

A special limited edition (only 450 copies) of all four volumes of The Germ was published in 1898 on Van Gelder handmade paper, by Thomas B. Mosher, Portland, Maine, USA.

A facsimile edition of all four volumes plus "Preface" by W.M. Rossetti was published by Elliot Stock in 1901 and issued in a slipcase.

== See also ==
- Organicism
