= Claudio and Isabella =

Painting by William Holman Hunt

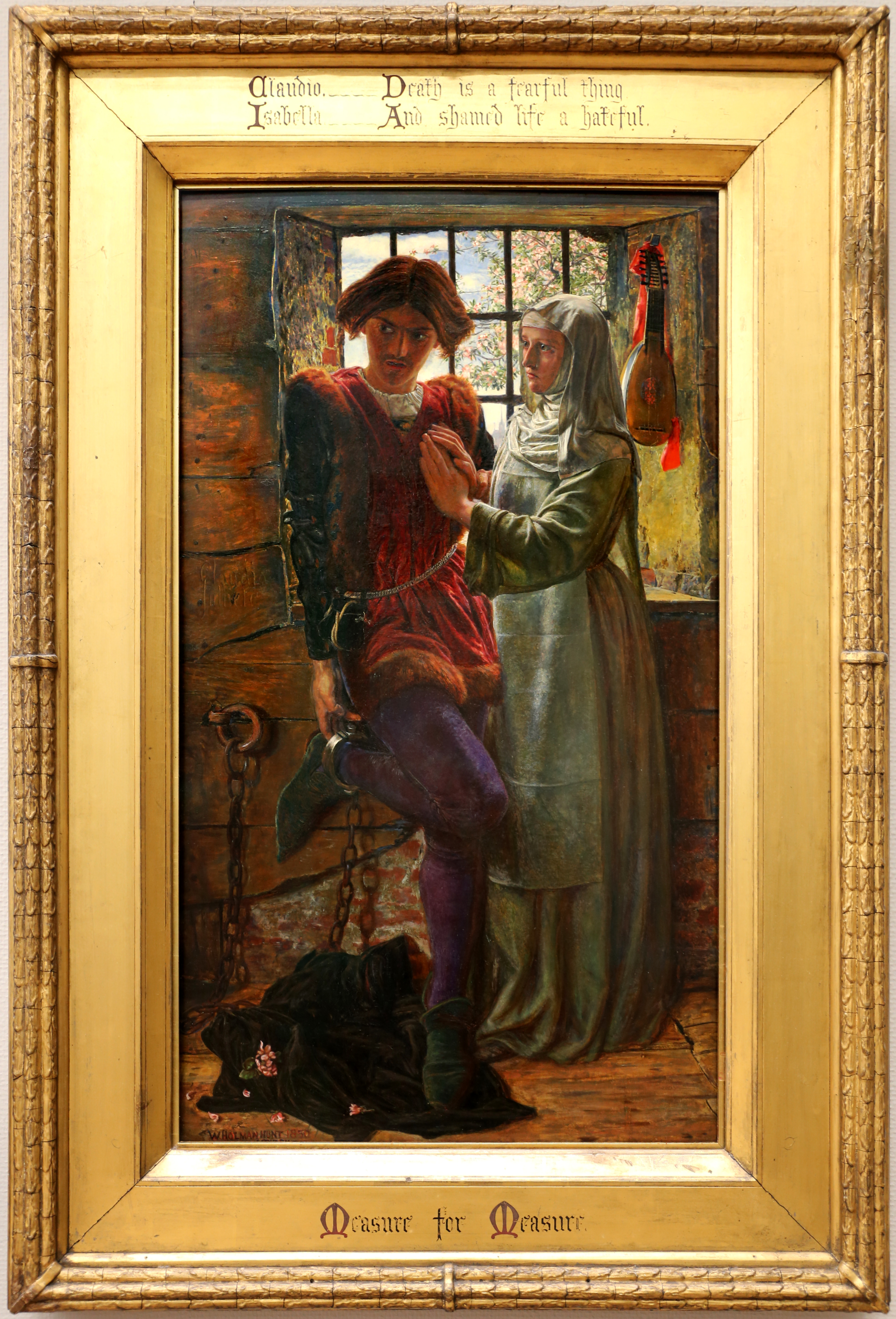
- Claudio: Death is a fearful thing Isabella: And shamed life a hateful
- Artist: William Holman Hunt
- Year: 1850
- Medium: Oil on Mahogany
- Dimensions: 75.8 cm × 42.6 cm (29.8 in × 16.8 in)
- Location: Tate Britain, London, UK

Claudio and Isabella is an 1850 Pre-Raphaelite oil painting by the English artist William Holman Hunt. It is based on a scene from William Shakespeare's Measure for Measure. In this scene, Isabella is made to choose between sacrificing her brother's life or sacrificing her virginity to Angelo. Hunt's image attempts to depict the characters' tangible emotions in the moment that this choice must be made. Hunt summarized the moral as: ‘Thou shall not do evil that good may come.’

Isabella's purity is reflected by her upright position, her plain white habit, and the sun shining on her through the window, out of which a church can be seen in the distance. Her brother Claudio, shackled to the wall, clearly uncomfortable in both mind and body. He is turned away from his sister, ashamed of the circumstances that brought them here and confronted with the fear of his own imminent death.

When it was first put on display at the Royal Academy of Dramatic Art in 1853 it was accompanied by a quotation from the play:

'Tis too horrible!

The weariest, and most loathed worldly life, That age, ache penury and imprisonment Can lay on nature, is a paradise

To what we fear of death.

— Measure for Measure, Act III, scene I

In 1864 Hunt issued a pamphlet advertising the engraving of Claudio and Isabella, in which he summarised the picture's 'deep and noble moral' as 'Thou shall not do evil that good may come.'

The painter Walter Deverell was the model for Claudio.
