= Walter Deverell =

British painter (1827–1854)

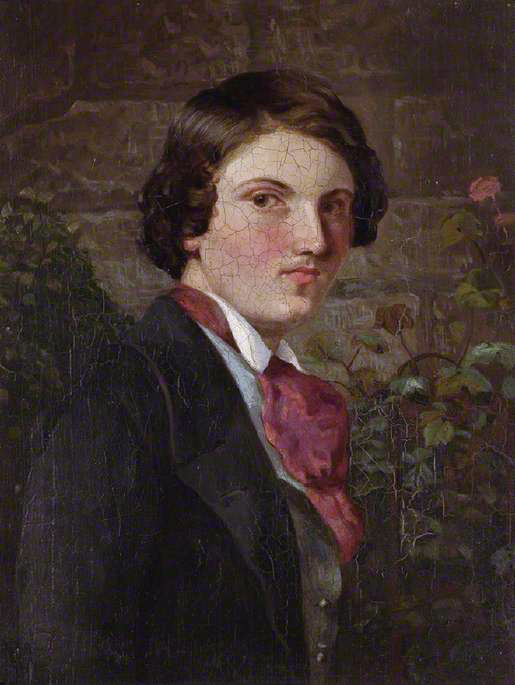
- Self-portrait, c. 1849
- Born: Walter Howell Deverell; 1 October 1827; Charlottesville, Virginia, USA
- Died: 2 February 1854 (aged 26)
- Resting place: Holy Trinity Church, Brompton
- Education: Royal Academy Schools
- Known for: Painter, model, discovery of Elizabeth Siddal
- Notable work: Twelfth Night, or Twelfth Night, Act II, Scene IV, 1849-1850
- Movement: Pre-Raphaelite

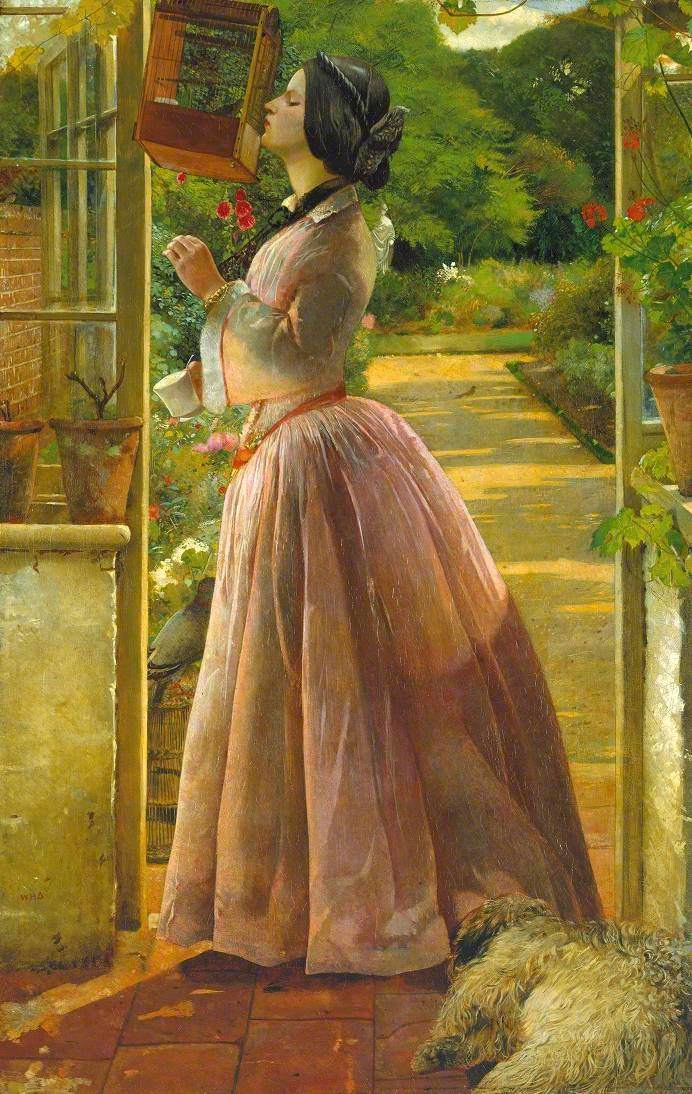
A Pet, 1853, oils, 84 x 57 cm, Tate

Walter Howell Deverell (1 October 1827 – 2 February 1854) was an American-born British artist who was closely associated with the Pre-Raphaelite Brotherhood. He was friends with the original members John Everett Millais, Dante Gabriel Rossetti, and William Holman Hunt when they were students together in London, but by the time his own membership was coming about in 1850 the group was breaking up. One scholar has commented that "He played a more active part in the group than some of its actual members, and if evidence of his paintings is to be considered, Deverell appears more Pre-Raphaelite than some of the 'pristine' Pre-Raphaelites".

After his family moved back to England when he was two, he lived in London for the rest of his life. His highly promising career was ended by his death at the age of twenty-six, after a period of declining health. He only finished "about eight" paintings, and apparently only sold one in his lifetime. He also features as a model in a number of paintings by other artists.

== Biography ==
Deverell was born in Charlottesville, Virginia, into an English family. They moved back to London when Walter was two years old. His father, a schoolteacher in America, became Secretary of the Government School of Design, which later became the Royal College of Art, and then occupied parts of Somerset House on the Strand. The family lived at the premises until 1852, the year before his father died. Deverell had younger siblings, for whom he was the main support after the death of his father in 1853.

In 1843 Deverell began to work in the office of a solicitor in Westminster, but he wanted to be an artist and in 1844 entered Sass's Drawing Academy, in Bloomsbury Street. There he met Dante Gabriel Rossetti, a year younger, who moved to the Royal Academy Schools the same year, with Deverell following in 1846. There he met William Holman Hunt (his exact contemporary) and John Everett Millais (two years younger). These four began in 1848 "a short-lived revival of the Cyclographic Society, a group of students and amateurs who circulated drawings among themselves, inviting criticism from fellow members". He was appointed assistant master at the School of Design in 1848.

He was not one of the seven, including Rossetti, Hunt and Millais, who founded the Pre-Raphaelite Brotherhood later that year. It appears Rossetti in particular wanted him to join when James Collinson left in May 1850, and he was nominated for membership, but this was never confirmed. But Millais was apparently less keen, and in the end he never joined what was at that point a formal group with a membership list. By this time the original group was drifting apart, and the meeting where his membership was to be confirmed never took place.

However, he was one of the owners of, and contributors to, the short-lived Pre-Raphaelite magazine The Germ, which had four issues in 1850, including an etching of Viola and Olivia in the final issue, based on his Twelfth Night.

In 1851, he and Rossetti shared a studio at 17 Red Lion Square, later occupied by William Morris and Edward Burne-Jones. It consisted of three rooms on the first floor, and the studio room, looking north, had its window extended up to the ceiling to admit more light. The Pre-Raphaelites had been founded in 1848, and under Rossetti's influence Deverell's work began to show the influence of the movement, while still retaining features more characteristic of earlier genre painters like Charles Robert Leslie.

It was Deverell who "discovered" Elizabeth Siddal, the Pre-Raphaelites' most important early model, "almost certainly" in 1849, when he visited with his mother the shop where she was working. However, despite his attraction to her (Hunt reported he referred to her as a "miraculous creature"), she later married Rossetti. Henry Treffry Dunn was recommended for the position of Rossetti's assistant by Deverell.

Walter Deverell died on 2 February 1854 at the age of twenty-six from Bright's disease, in the company of Millais; at least, according to a letter Millais wrote on the 4th, he was in the house but not able to be in the room. He was buried in the churchyard of Holy Trinity Church, Brompton; Rossetti could not bring himself to attend the funeral.

Rosetti's brother William Michael Rossetti wrote an obituary, published in The Spectator which "proclaimed him 'An artist from whose independent thought and keen sense of beauty we had felt warranted in anticipating results of unusual excellence'. This obituary in a leading weekly was the closest Deverell ever came to public prominence".

== Works ==
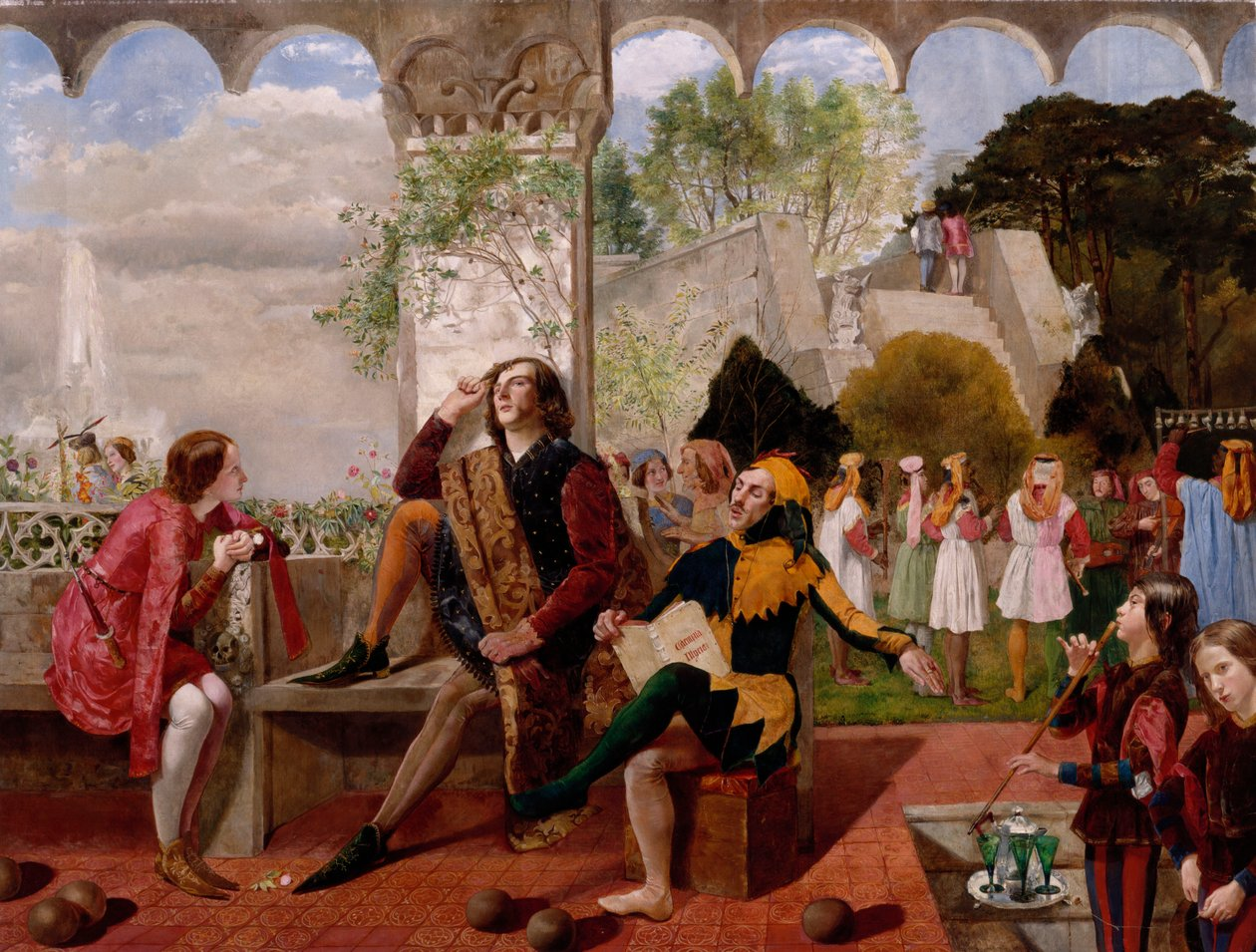
Twelfth Night, Act II, Scene IV (text), his most significant painting. 1849-1850, oil on canvas, 102 x 133 cm., 40 x 52 in

Deverell completed very few important works, exhibiting only four paintings at the Royal Academy before his early death. None were very large, with the largest only just over a metre wide, and four featured scenes from Shakespeare, a very common source of subjects at the time. Scene from A Midsummer Night's Dream. Titania and Bottom (1851) by Edwin Landseer is one exactly contemporary example. Two of Deverell's other completed oils are rather tightly composed portraits of women with pet birds; recent criticism has suggested that the women as well as the birds can be considered as "caged". Elaine Shefer analyses the paintings, seeing Siddal as the model in both, in terms of the relationships between Deverell, Siddal and Rossetti. Before his father's death, Deverell lived in Kew, now part of London, where one of these, A Pet (or The Pet, now Tate), was set in his house. This seems to be the only painting he sold in his lifetime; it was bought by Hunt and Millais in 1853 as an "act of charity".

His largest painting, and probably his most important work, was Twelfth Night, or Twelfth Night, Act II, Scene IV which fetched £600,650 ($957,436) in an auction at Christie's in 2003, sold from the collection formed in London by Malcolm Forbes. It "was clearly intended to be a major statement and a bid for recognition" by the 21-year old artist, and is his "first major work in the Pre-Raphaelite style". The models for the three main figures are Deverell himself as Orsino, Elizabeth Siddal as Viola (in her first appearance in a Pre-Raphaelite painting), and Dante Gabriel Rossetti as Feste. He never managed to sell it, and after Deverell's death it was looked after by Richard Burchett for a decade or so, before being turned over to Rossetti, who was handling aspects of Deverell's estate for the benefit of his heirs. The painting is now in a private collection.

The reviews were mixed when it was shown at the National Institution of Fine Arts in 1850, and Deverell was unable to sell it during his lifetime; after his death it was owned by William Bell Scott and various others; though seen in exhibitions, it has never yet been in a public collection. Among other things the handling of perspective has consistently been criticized; according to Timothy Hilton: "What perspective there is in the painting leads in different directions to nowhere. Neither trees nor architecture have their normal roles, and Orsino's favourite art is represented by the members of a weird Arab band ...".

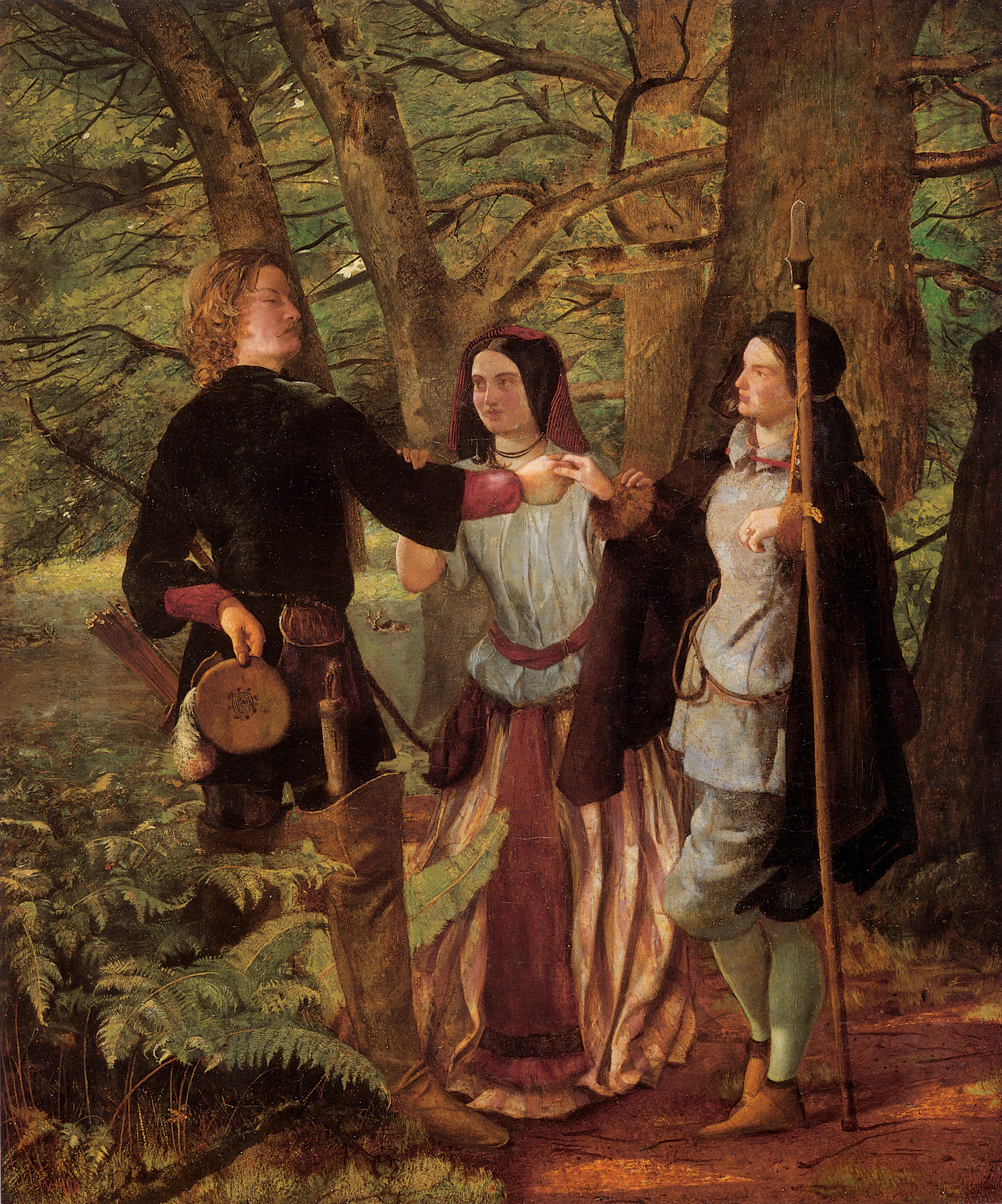
Scene from As You Like It, 1853, oils, 60 x 50 cm, Birmingham Museums Trust

In 1893 it was listed for sale by the book-dealer Bernard Quaritch for only £25. In 1972 it was sold from the collection of "the late William Edmondson" at Christie's for 12,000 guineas. There is an ink and pencil study in Tate Britain, which shows the composition before Deverell "made numerous alterations to the design, solving at least some of the problems he encountered in the drawing".

Another subject, The Banishment of Hamlet, was exhibited at the National Institution of Fine Arts in 1851, receiving a brutal review in The Athenaeum:

Hamlet himself, in spite of his being perched upon a square box in the gawky, shrinking attitude of a delinquent school-boy, might, with an effort, be allowed to pass as not wholly un-Shakespearian; but his yellow, pink, and blue majesty Claudius, who pokes towards his nephew in a withering attitude – copied, perchance, from the Bayeux Tapestry – is.

This too was never sold by Deverell, and became a running joke between Rossetti and Deverell when they shared a studio. It was looked after by Burchett after his death, but was later destroyed in a gas explosion. A drawing survives in the Ashmolean Museum.

A painting that is now lost was exhibited at the Royal Academy in 1848: Margaret in Prison from the Faust legend, presumably via Goethe.

At his death he left The Doctor's Last Visit and Children Watching a Funeral unfinished, as well as The Irish Vagrants, a social realist subject now in the Johannesburg Art Gallery, which his journal shows neither he nor visitors to his studio were satisfied with, and was apparently partly reworked, and never submitted for exhibition.

== As model ==
Several contemporary accounts comment on Deverell's striking good looks: WM Rossetti recalled "Deverell was one of the handsomest young men I have known; belonging to a type not properly to be termed feminine, but which might rather be dubbed 'troubadourish'…", and the gossipy memoirs of William Bell Scott described him as "of great but impatient ability, and so lovely yet manly a character of face, with its finely-formed nose, dark eyes and eyebrows, and young silky moustache, that it was said ladies had gone hurriedly round by side streets to catch another sight of him". He was in considerable demand as a model among the Pre-Raphaelite group, featuring as Claudio in William Holman Hunt's Claudio and Isabella (1850–53, Tate), as a page (at front left) in Ford Madox Brown's Chaucer at the Court of Edward III (1847–51, Art Gallery of New South Wales), in profile in John Everett Millais's Isabella (at left rear, Walker Art Gallery, Liverpool, 1848–49), as well as his appearance as Orsino in his own Twelfth Night.

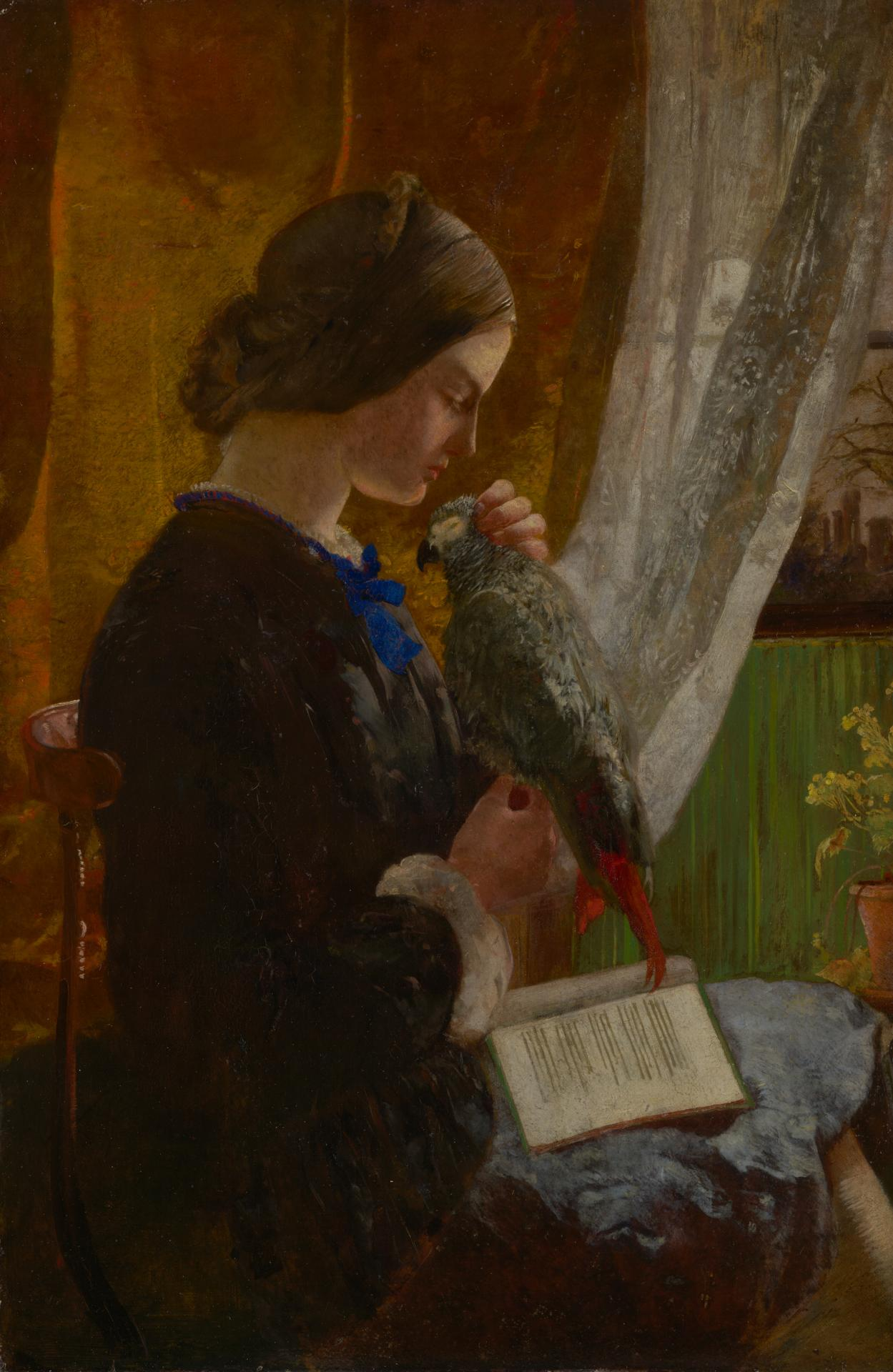
The Grey Parrot with Elizabeth Siddal, c. 1852–1853, National Gallery of Victoria

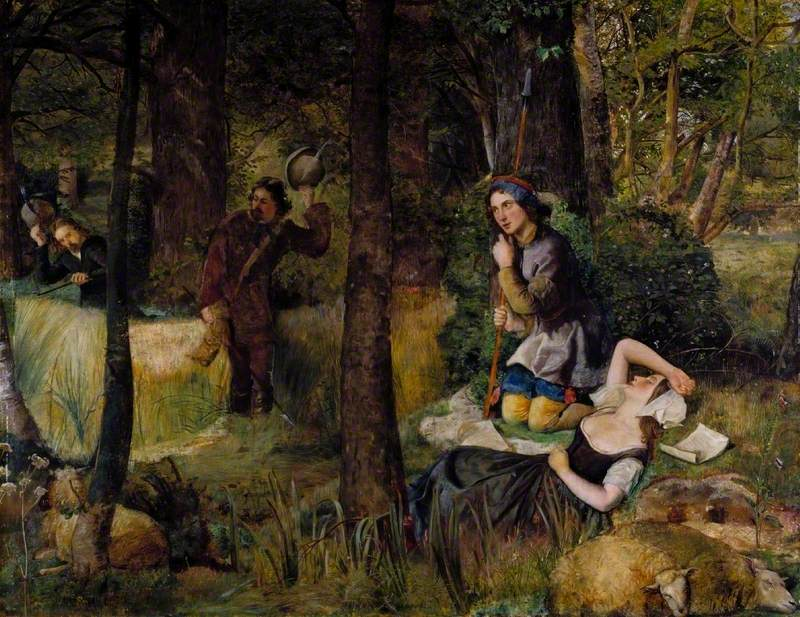
Scene from As You Like It, oils, Shipley Art Gallery

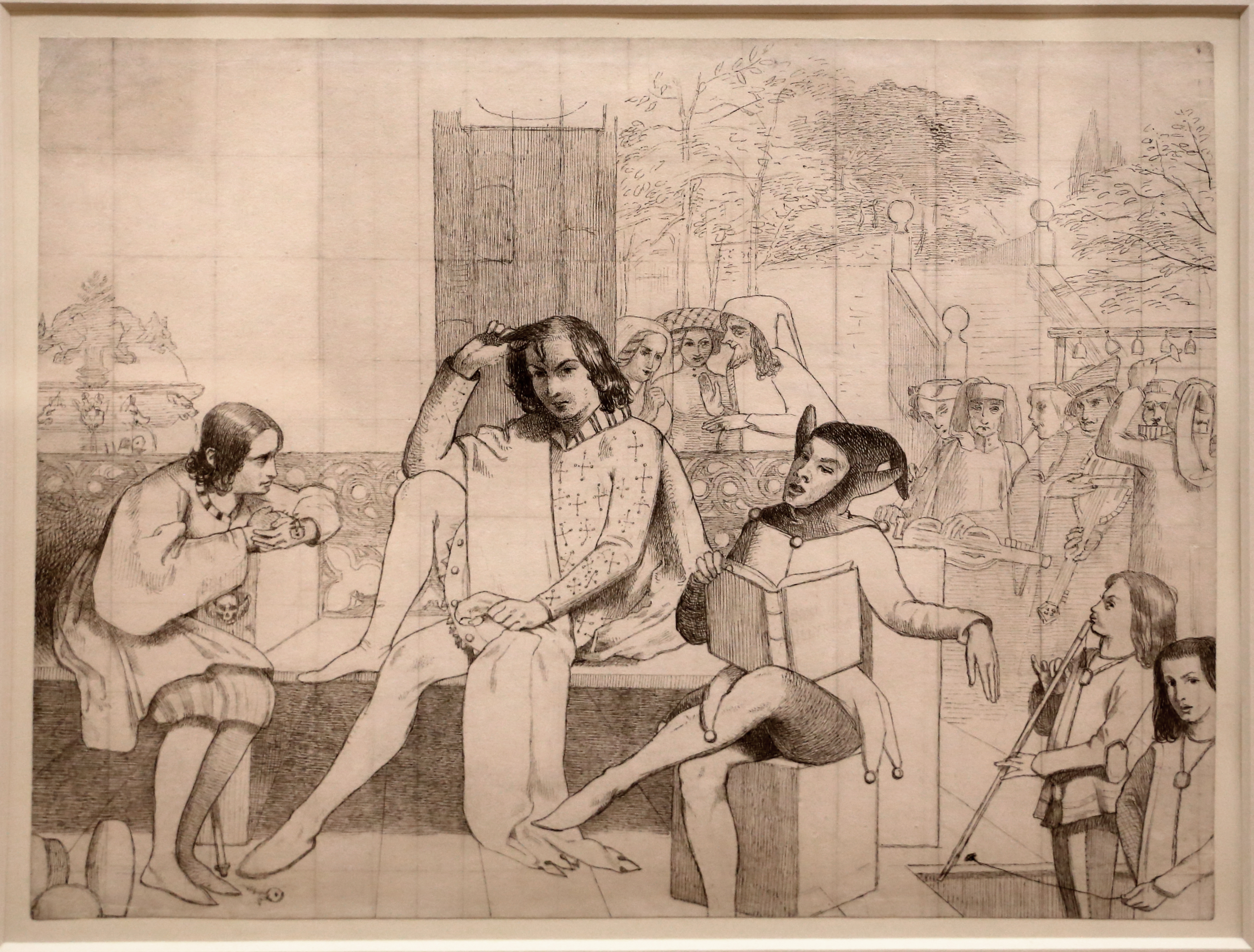
Drawing for Twelfth Night, Tate

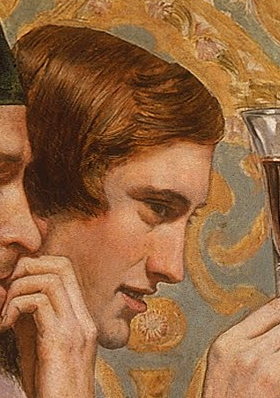
John Everett Millais, Isabella, detail with Deverell as model

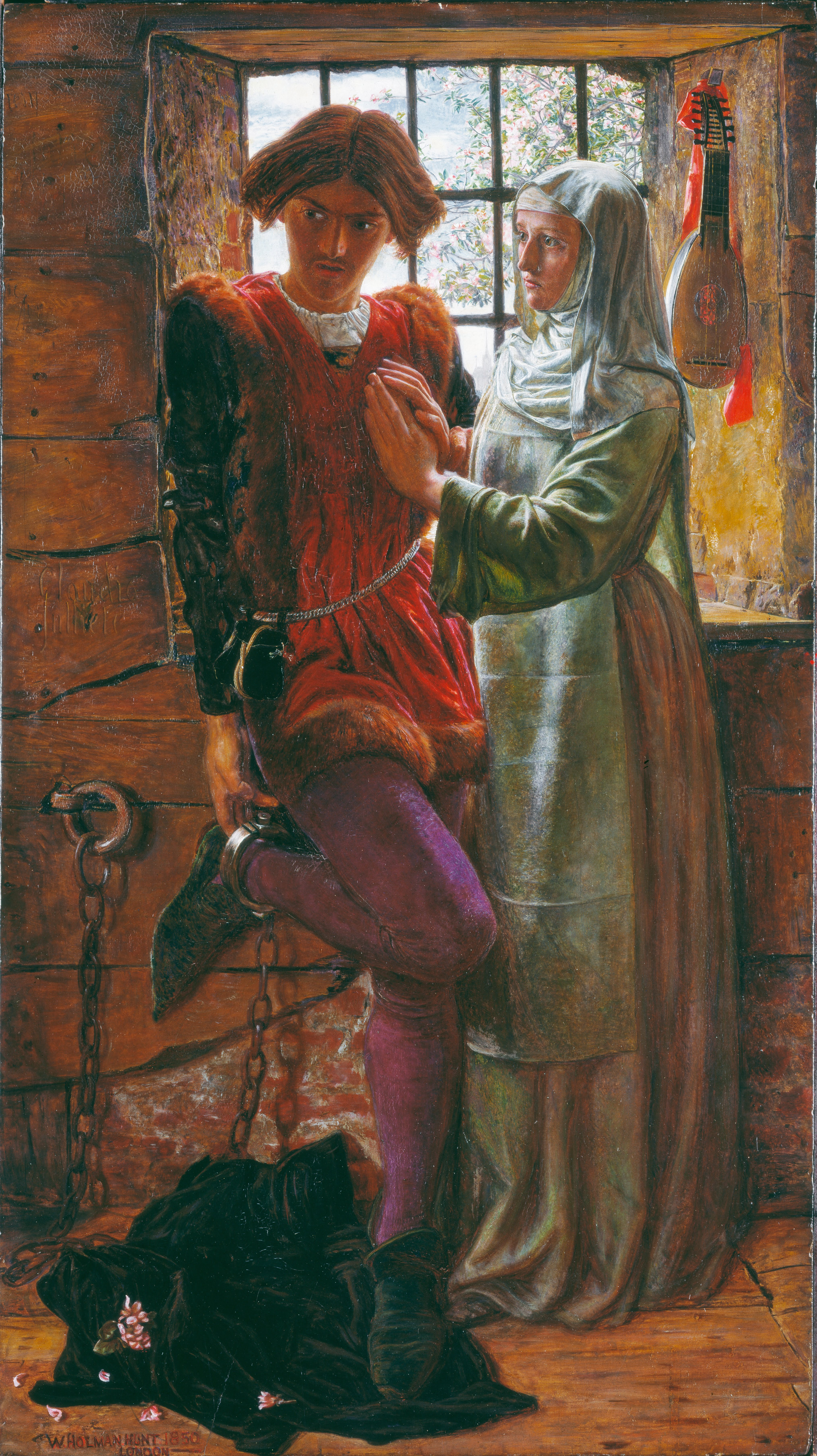
William Holman Hunt's Claudio and Isabella, 1850–53, Tate

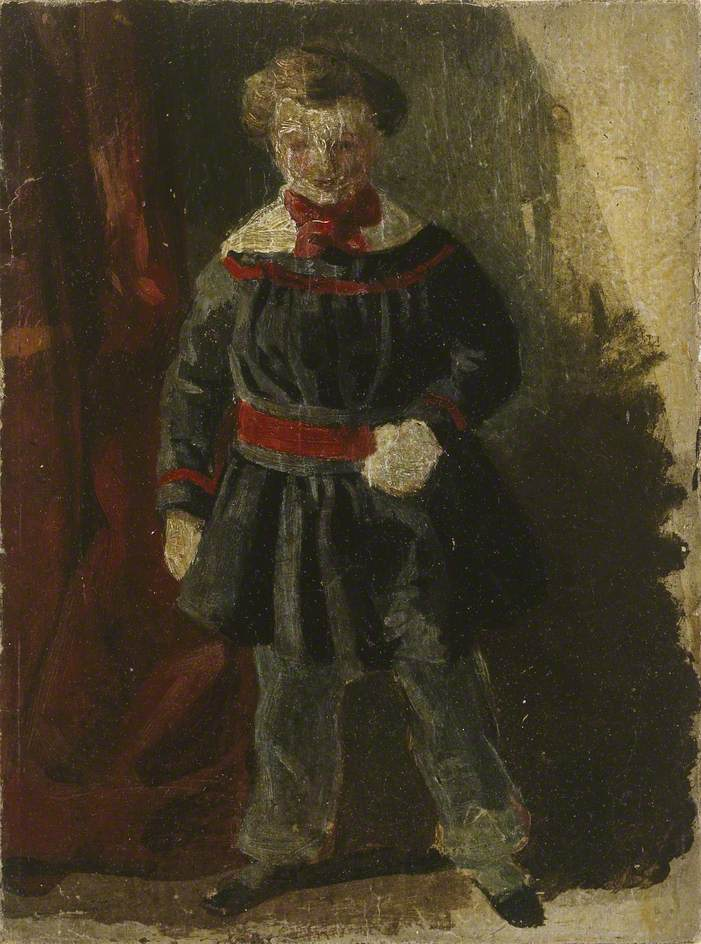
Portrait of his brother Wykeham Deverell, Ashmolean Museum

== See also ==
- List of Pre-Raphaelite paintings – including the work of Walter Deverell
