= Isabella, or the Pot of Basil =

Poem by John Keats

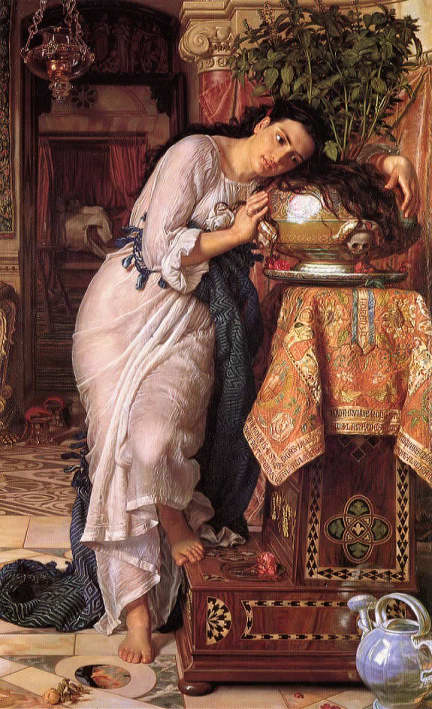
Isabella and the Pot of Basil by William Holman Hunt, 1868

Isabella, or the Pot of Basil (1818) is a narrative poem by John Keats adapted from a story in Boccaccio's Decameron (IV, 5). It tells the tale of a young woman whose family intend to marry her to "some high noble and his olive trees", but who falls for Lorenzo, one of her brothers' employees. When the brothers learn of this, they murder Lorenzo and bury his body. His ghost informs Isabella in a dream. She exhumes the body and buries the head in a pot of basil which she tends obsessively, while pining away.

The poem was a precursor to The Eve of Saint Agnes. Both are set in the Middle Ages and concern passionate and dangerous romances. It was published in 1820 along with the latter work and others.

The poem was popular with Pre-Raphaelite painters, who illustrated several episodes from it, notably Isabella and the Pot of Basil by William Holman Hunt, Isabella and the Pot of Basil by John William Waterhouse and Isabella (also known as Lorenzo and Isabella) by John Everett Millais. Later, John White Alexander depicted the poem in his 1897 Isabella and the Pot of Basil, currently held at the Museum of Fine Arts, Boston. Frank Bridge also wrote a symphonic poem of the same name in 1907.
