= Portrait of Hugh Fenn =

Painting by John Everett Millais

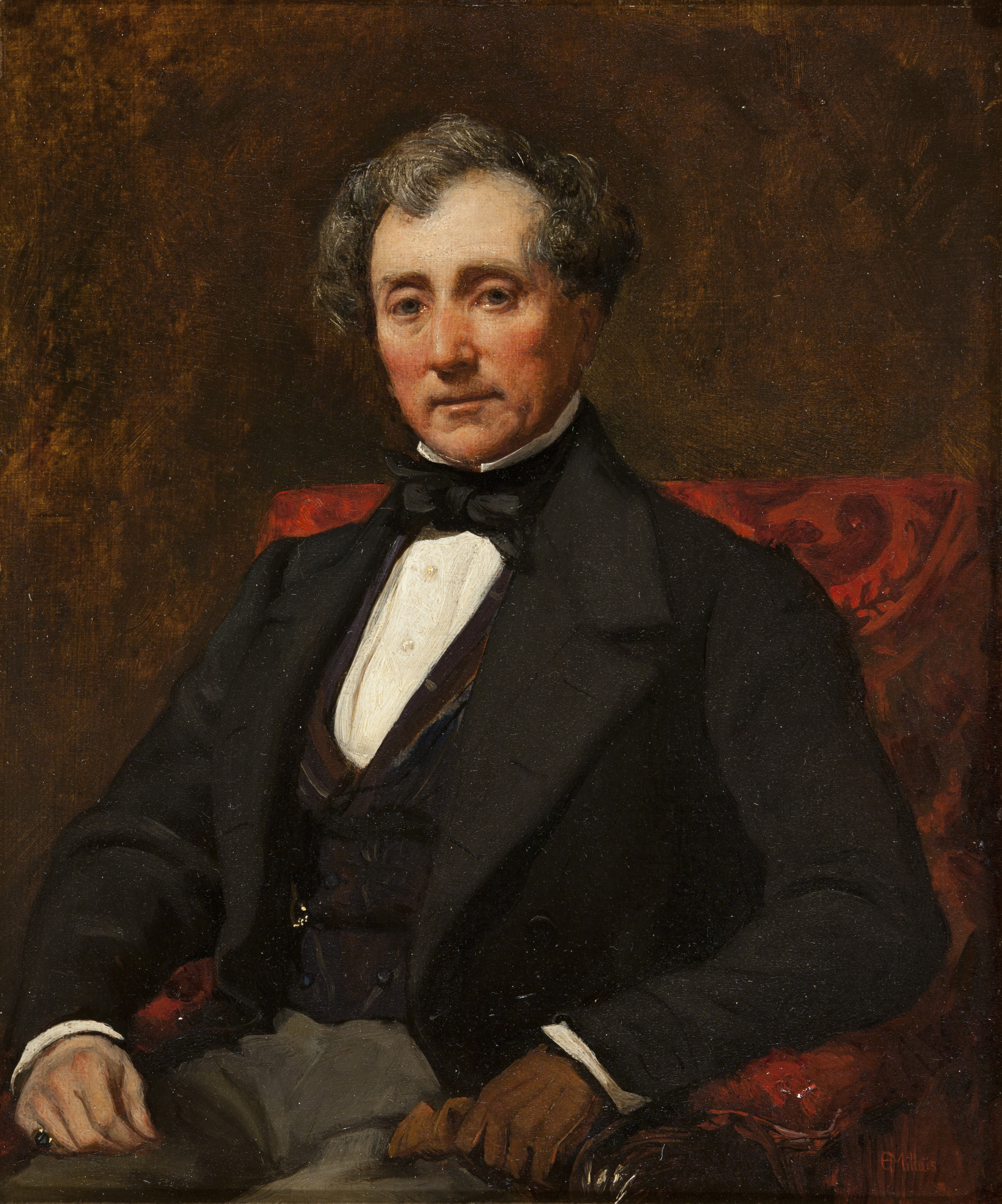
- Artist: John Everett Millais
- Year: 1848
- Type: Oil on canvas, portrait painting
- Dimensions: 29.1 cm × 24.5 cm (11.5 in × 9.6 in)
- Location: Collection of the Owens Art Gallery, Mount Allison University

Portrait of Hugh Fenn, also known as William Hugh Fenn and Portrait of W. Hugh Fenn, is an 1848 oil painting by the English artist John Everett Millais. It depicts a man seated in an armchair, wearing one glove and holding the other.

== The painting ==
William Holman Hunt wrote that Millais painted the portrait in late October 1848, just before he started work on Isabella (1848–1849). This would make it the first painting produced by any of the Pre-Raphaelites following the foundation of the Pre-Raphaelite Brotherhood. Hunt compared the painting to the work of Van Eyck and Holbein.

The sitter, William Hugh Fenn, was the Treasurer at Covent Garden and the father of a friend of Millais, William Wilthew Fenn. Millais painted the portrait on condition that an earlier portrait he had made of Fenn senior be destroyed. In 1898 the painting was recorded as owned by W. W. Fenn.

Fenn senior also sat for Millais as one of the subjects in Isabella. He is the man third from the back on the right-hand side, peeling an apple.

== Exhibition history ==
The painting has been in the collection of the Owens Art Gallery, Mount Allison University, Sackville, New Brunswick, Canada since 1949.

The painting was first exhibited in the Fine Art Society exhibition The Collected Work of John Everett Millais in 1881. It hung in a special Winter Exhibition at the Royal Academy, London, held between January and March 1898, which featured the collected works of Millais. It was exhibited at Tate Gallery, London in 1984, as part of The Pre-Raphaelites exhibition. In 2022 the painting was exhibited in the Salon Hanging exhibition at the Owens Art Gallery, where some of the collection is hung in the style of 1895, when the artworks were used as a teaching collection for the students at the university.

== See also ==
- List of paintings by John Everett Millais
