= Isabella and the Pot of Basil =

Painting by William Holman Hunt

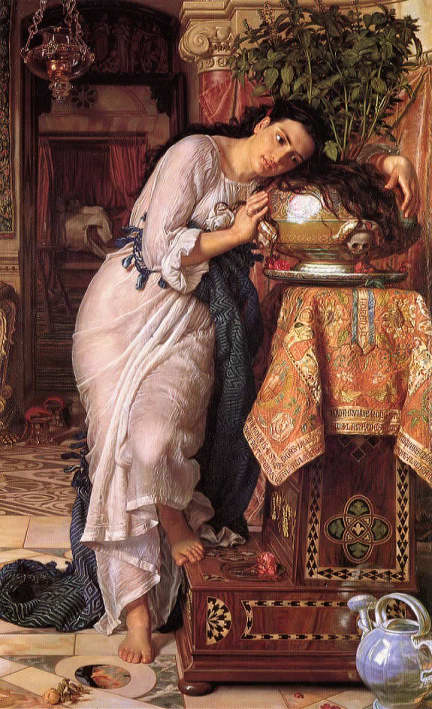
- Artist: William Holman Hunt
- Year: 1868
- Medium: Oil on canvas
- Dimensions: 187 cm × 116 cm (74 in × 46 in)
- Location: Laing Art Gallery, Newcastle upon Tyne

Isabella and the Pot of Basil is a painting completed in 1868 by the English artist William Holman Hunt depicting a scene from John Keats's poem Isabella, or the Pot of Basil. It depicts the heroine Isabella caressing the basil pot in which she had buried the severed head of her murdered lover Lorenzo.

Hunt had drawn an illustration of the poem in 1848, shortly after the foundation of the Pre-Raphaelite Brotherhood. Still, he had not developed it into a completed painting. The drawing portrayed a very different scene, depicting Lorenzo as a clerk at work while Isabella's brothers study their accounts and order around underlings.

Shortly after his marriage, Hunt returned to the poem in 1866, when he began to paint several erotically charged subjects. His sensuous painting Il Dolce far niente (roughly translated: the sweetness of doing nothing) had sold quickly, and he conceived the idea for a new work depicting Isabella. Having travelled with his pregnant wife Fanny to Italy, Hunt began work on the painting in Florence. However, after giving birth, Fanny died from fever in December 1866. Hunt turned the painting into a memorial to his wife, using her features for Isabella. He worked on it steadily in the months after her death, returning to England in 1867, and finally completing it in January 1868. The painting was purchased and exhibited by the dealer Ernest Gambart.

== The painting ==
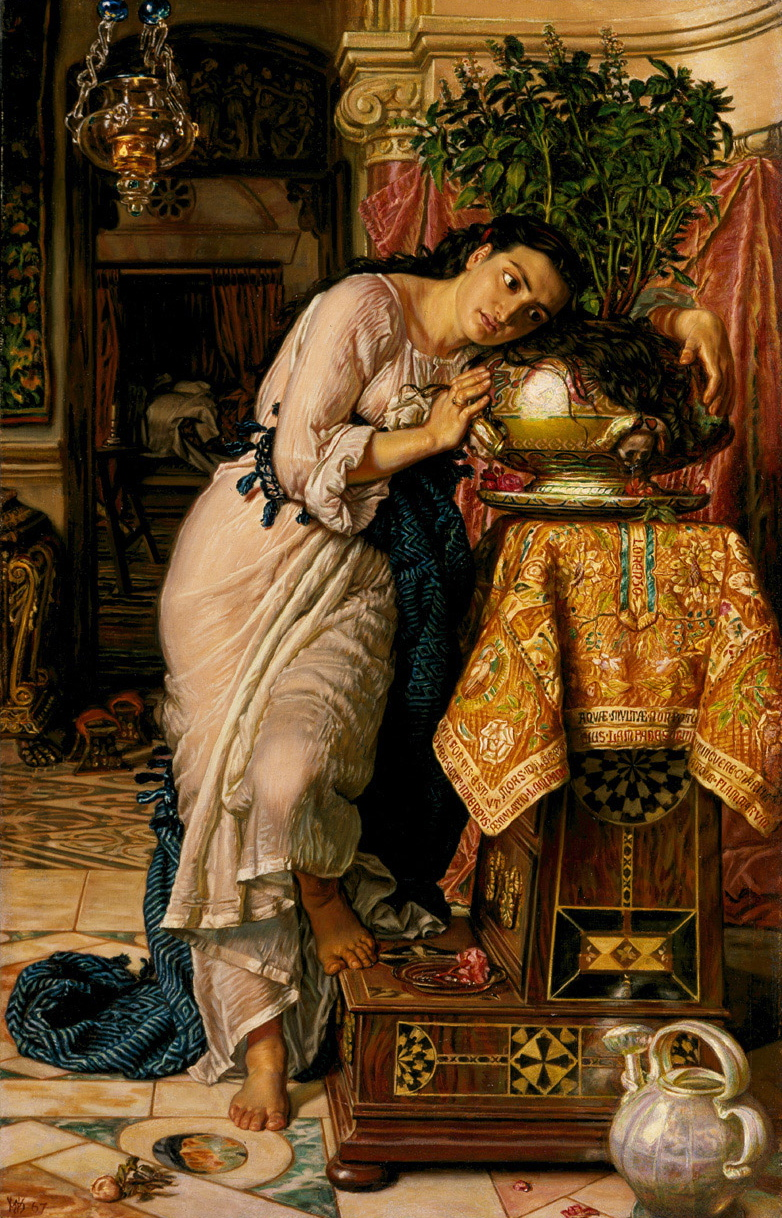
Smaller version painted by Hunt in 1868, formerly owned by the Delaware Art Museum and now in the collection of the Fine Arts Museums of San Francisco. Note that the pattern of the inlay on the prie-dieu differs from the original.

The painting portrays Isabella, unable to sleep, dressed in a semi-transparent nightgown, having just left her bed, which is visible with the cover turned over in the background. She drapes herself over an altar she has created to Lorenzo from an elaborately inlaid prie-dieu over which a richly embroidered cloth has been placed. On the cloth is the majolica pot, decorated with skulls, in which Lorenzo's head is interred. Her abundant hair flows over the pot and around the flourishing plant, reflecting Keats's words that Isabella "hung over her sweet Basil evermore,/And moistened it with tears unto the core." Behind her, next to the doorway, are a pair of pattens, next to the edge of a cassone.

The emphasis on sensuality, rich colours and elaborate decorative objects reflects the growing Aesthetic movement and similar features in the work of Hunt's Pre-Raphaelite associates John Everett Millais and Dante Gabriel Rossetti, such as Millais's Pot Pourri and Rossetti's Venus Verticordia. The pose of the figure also resembles Thomas Woolner's sculpture Civilization, which was partly modelled by Fanny's sister Alice.

== Inspiration to other artists ==
Hunt's work influenced several later artists, who adopted the same subject. Most notable are the paintings by John White Alexander (1897) and John William Waterhouse (1907). Alexander and Waterhouse reproduced Hunt's title and developed variations on his composition. Alexander's composition adapts the subject to a Whistlerian style. Waterhouse reverses the composition, and places the scene in a garden, but retains the motif of the water-jug and the decorative skull.

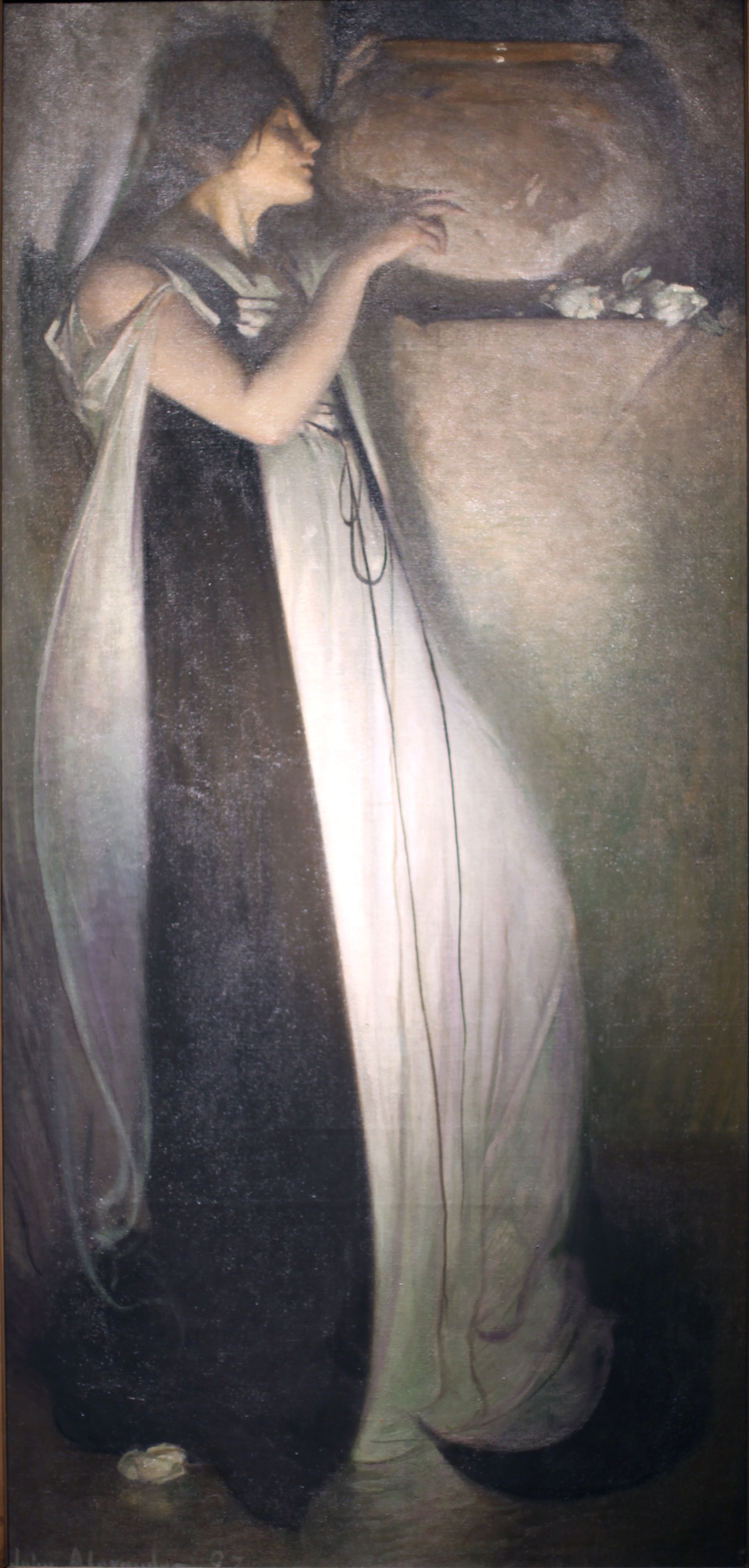
Isabella and the Pot of Basil
John White Alexander,
oil on canvas, 1897, Museum of Fine Arts, Boston

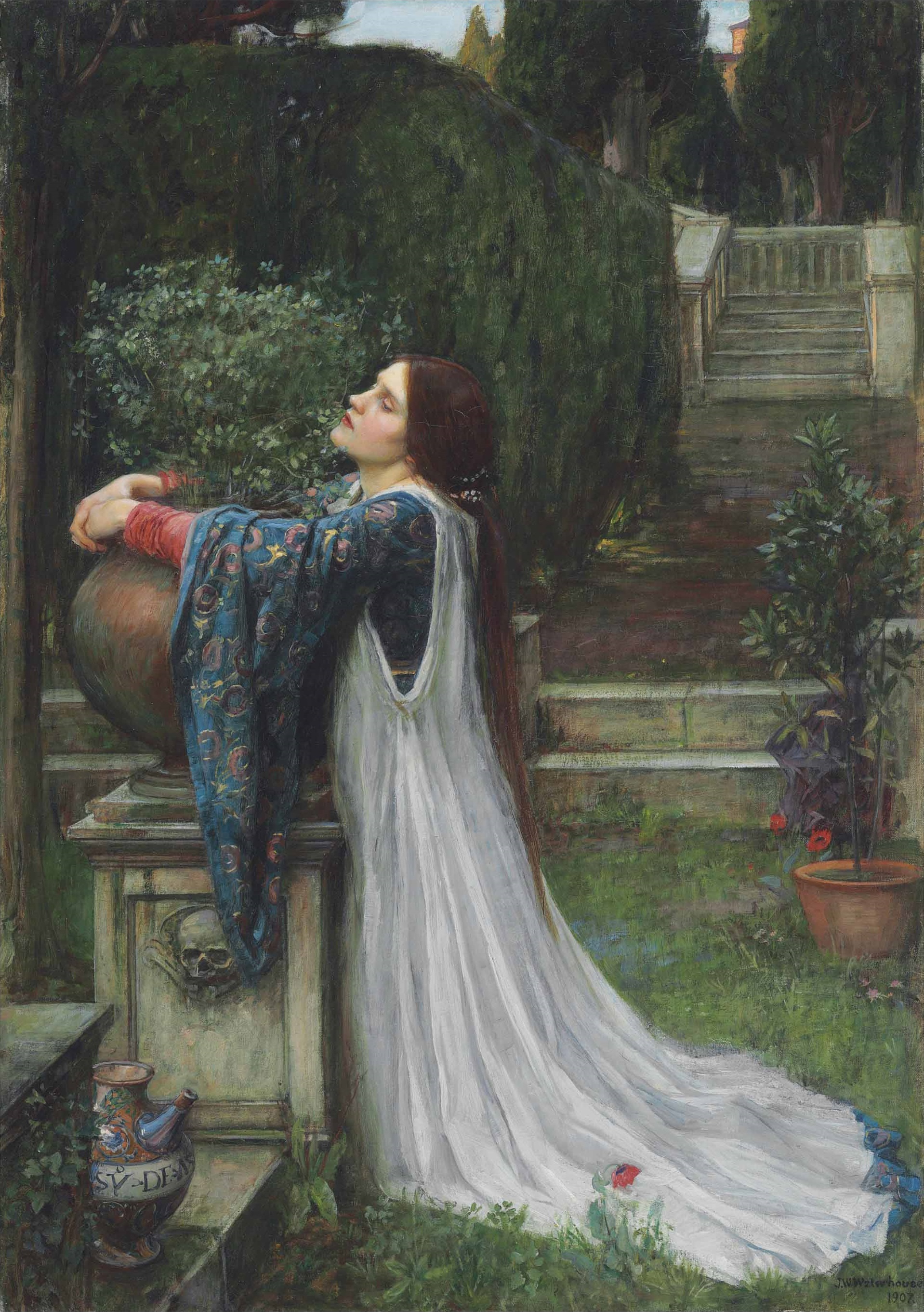
Isabella and the Pot of Basil
John William Waterhouse,
1907, Private collection.

Rossetti, who had fallen out with Hunt, was unmoved by the painting, describing the figure of Isabella as looking like a charwoman. "[H]ow grimy and sweaty is the poor thing's face, and how she must yearn for her beer", he wrote.
