= Margaret Isabel McHenry =

American-Canadian heiress

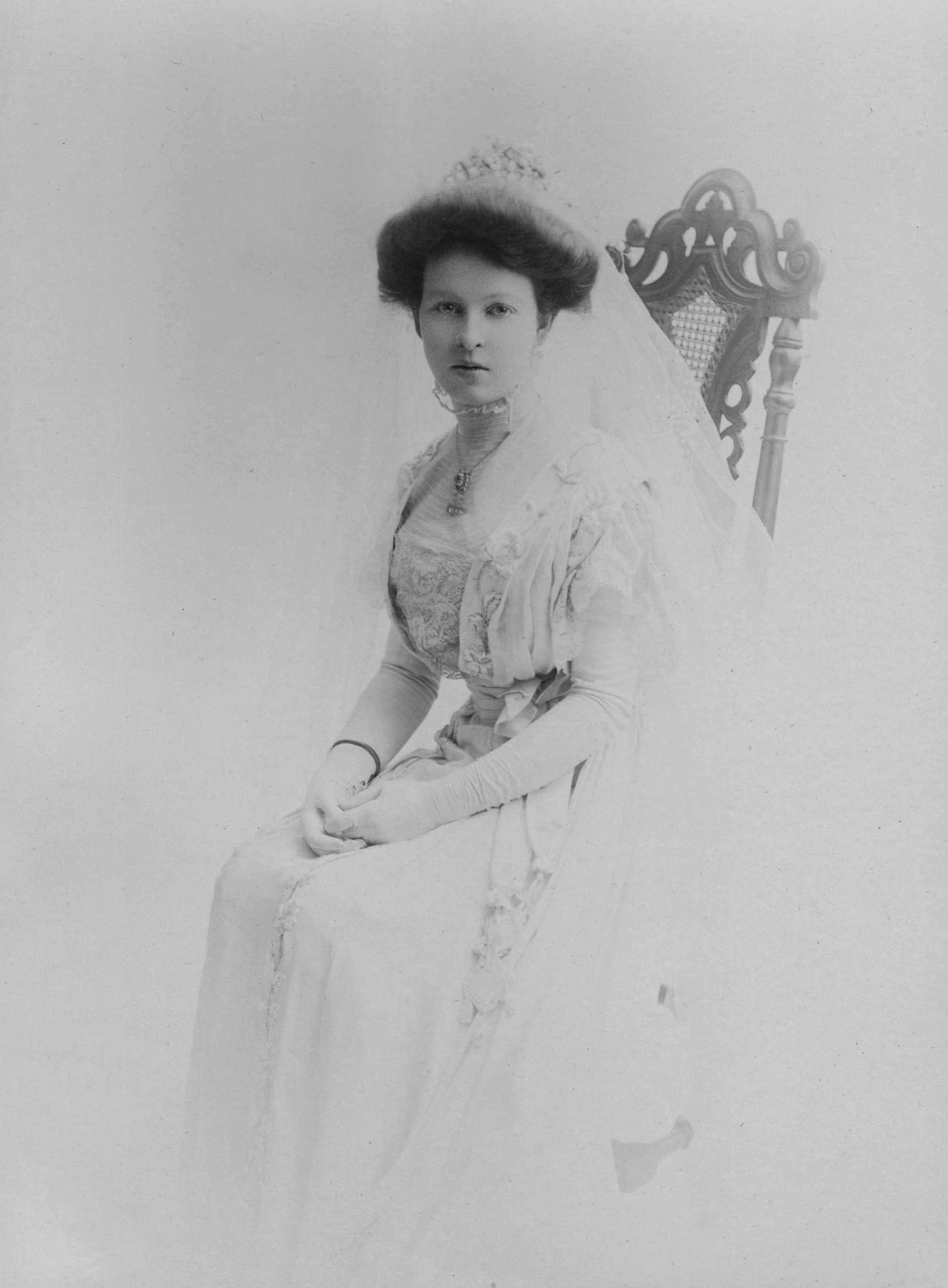
- Wedding portrait taken on 28 October 1885
- Born: 26 May 1860; Montreal, Quebec, Canada
- Died: 26 May 1932 (aged 72); Brockville, Ontario, Canada
- Burial place: St Francis Xavier Cemetery, Brockville, Ontario
- Citizenship: Canadian, American
- Organization: Catholic Women's League of Canada
- Known for: Meeting with Pope Pius XI
- Spouse: William John "W.J." McHenry
- Children: Alice McHenry (daughter); Charles Roderick McHenry (son); Margaret Isabel "Babe" McHenry (daughter)
- Parents: Michael Doheny Jr. (father); Alice Ryan (mother)
- Relatives: Hugh Doheny (brother); Michael Doheny Jr. (brother); Hugh Ryan (railway magnate) (uncle); John Ryan (railway magnate) (uncle); Edward L. Doheny (first cousin); Elinor Claire Millais (second cousin)

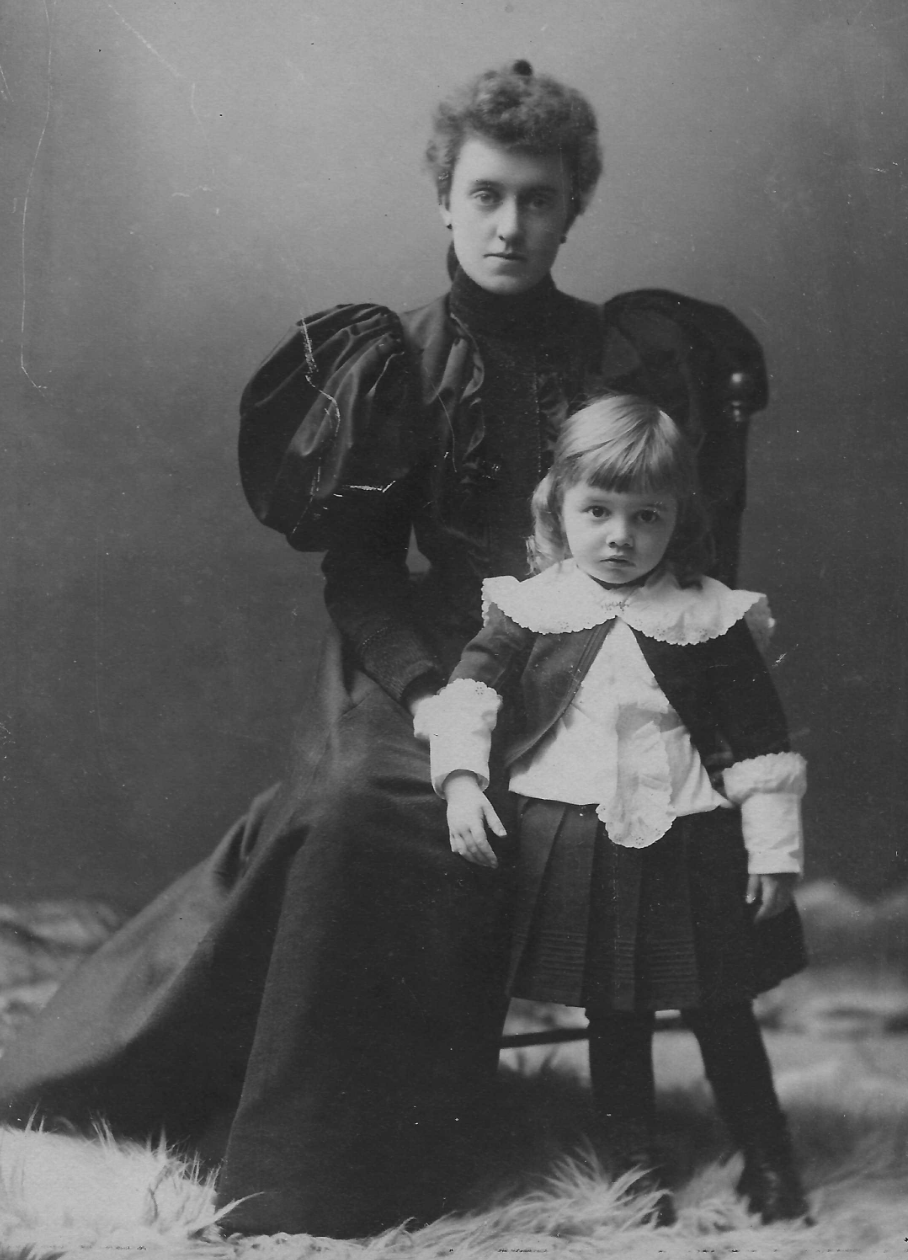
Margaret Isabel McHenry pictured as a child alongside her mother, Canadian heiress Alice Ryan (1830–1906).

Margaret Isabel McHenry (née Doheny) (26 May 1860 – 26 May 1932), was an American-Canadian heiress, benefactor of the Catholic Church, president of the Catholic Women's League of Canada and received a private papal audience with Pope Pius XI. The only daughter of Alice Ryan and Michael Doheny Jr., Margaret was a member of the Irish-Canadian Ryan family on her mother's side; including her godfather, industrialist Hugh Ryan, and uncle, railway magnate John Ryan. On her father's side she was the first cousin of Californian oil tycoon Edward L. Doheny.

== Family background ==
=== Parents and younger brothers ===
Margaret Isabel McHenry (née Doheny) was born 26 May 1860 in Montreal, Quebec, and the only daughter of Canadian heiress Alice Ryan and land developer Michael Doheny Jr.

Her brother, Hugh Doheny (b. 1863), followed their father into development and contracting, becoming involved in large-scale infrastructure projects. His most profitable undertaking was Section III of the New Welland Ship Canal, completed in 1913 at a cost of $9.5 million.

Her youngest brother, Michael Doheny Jr. (b. 1866), followed their maternal uncles into railway and infrastructure contracting. Described as a "well-known railway contractor," he worked on the construction and expansion of sections of the Canadian Pacific Railway, the Temiskaming and Northern Ontario Railway, and the Inverness Railway on Cape Breton Island. His contracting work also included major Canadian waterways, notably the Soulanges Canal along the Saint Lawrence River.

Michael was also involved in the early organization of professional ice hockey, serving as the first president of the Federal Hockey League.

=== Inheritance from Hugh Ryan ===
In 1899, national newspapers including The Globe and Mail reported Margaret Isabel McHenry received a substantial inheritance from her maternal uncle and godfather Canadian industrialist The Honourable Hugh Ryan; dubbed in the press as "Canada's wealthiest and greatest railroad contractor."

Her mother Alice Ryan was one of her uncle's primary beneficiaries, inheriting his landholdings in Manitoba, including commercial property in Winnipeg and Portage la Prairie, which McHenry inherited upon her mother's death in 1906.

== Marriage to W.J. McHenry and children ==
=== Wedding to W.J. McHenry and bridal coronet ===
Margaret "Maggie" Isabel Doheny married American lacrosse player turned retailer and whiskey magnate William John "W.J" McHenry, cousin of American Congressman John G. McHenry, on 28 October 1885 at St Anne's Church, Montreal, Quebec, with the lead celebrant being Belgian Redemptorists Reverend Father Jean-François Catulle. Preceding the nuptials the groom's new brigantine, named "Maggie" in honour of the bride-to-be, arrived in the stretch of the St Lawrence River closest to Montreal.

The bride's cousin, Helen Margaret "Nellie" Ryan, daughter of John Ryan, acted as the maid of honour and the groom's younger brother Roderick Charles McHenry acted as the best man. The papers of the time referred to Margaret as a "prominent young lady" and the "sumptuous wedding breakfast" held at her father's Rue Saint-Antoine residence; and often referenced William's prowess in sport prior to taking the reins of his father's retail interests and Pennsylvania-based McHenry Whiskey Co. A bridal coronet was commissioned by the Ryan Family and imported from France by the jewelry house Henry Birks & Sons; the openwork coronet formed a "honeycomb" lattice, with thirty old mine-cut diamonds of uniform size set at the junctions.

=== Children, widowhood and family residences ===
The couple had three children who survived to adulthood: Alice McHenry (b.1877), named for her grandmother Alice Ryan; Charles Roderick McHenry (b.1889); and Margaret Isabel "Babe" McHenry (b.1891). W.J. McHenry died suddenly at the age of forty-two on 28 October 1892, just a year after the birth of his daughter and when Margaret was only thirty-two years old.

The family would regularly spend time in New York City, often staying for extended periods at the Waldorf Astoria Hotel, before travelling to Havana, Cuba, to monitor William's businesses. They also travelled on the HMT Royal Edward ocean liner to England several times before it was repurposed during WWI. When in Canada, the family resided at their manor named "Fairyland" on the bank of the St. Lawrence River in Brockville, Ontario, which overlooked the Canadian-American boundary line into New York State, complete with servants quarters.

Portrait of Margaret Isabel's husband, American whiskey magnate W. J. McHenry, photographed in 1888 at Sartell's Imperial Cards studio in Philadelphia

Margaret Isabel "Babe" McHenry, McHenry's youngest daughter, married Alexander Joseph "A.J." McDonald, son of Donald Ronald "D.R". McDonald, Member of Provincial Parliament for Glengarry and Mayor of Cumberland, on 12 October 1920. The bride, whose fashion and jewelry choices on the day were reported on, was given away by her maternal uncle, Hugh Doheny; as her father had died only a year after her birth.

McHenry's son, Charles Roderick McHenry, married Georgiana McGreevy, daughter of civil servant and engineer Charles William McGreevy, on 2 June 1922 at St. Joseph's Church in Ottawa, where the McHenry family had donated several stained-glass windows. The wedding reception was a noted society event and held at the 660,000-square-foot Château Laurier.

== Catholic Women's League of Canada ==
The Catholic Women's League (CWL) was founded by Margaret Fletcher in 1906 and its Canadian offshoot, the Catholic Women's League of Canada (CWLC), was founded in 1920 by Katherine Hughes. McHenry was a founding member and received committee appointments starting in 1923.

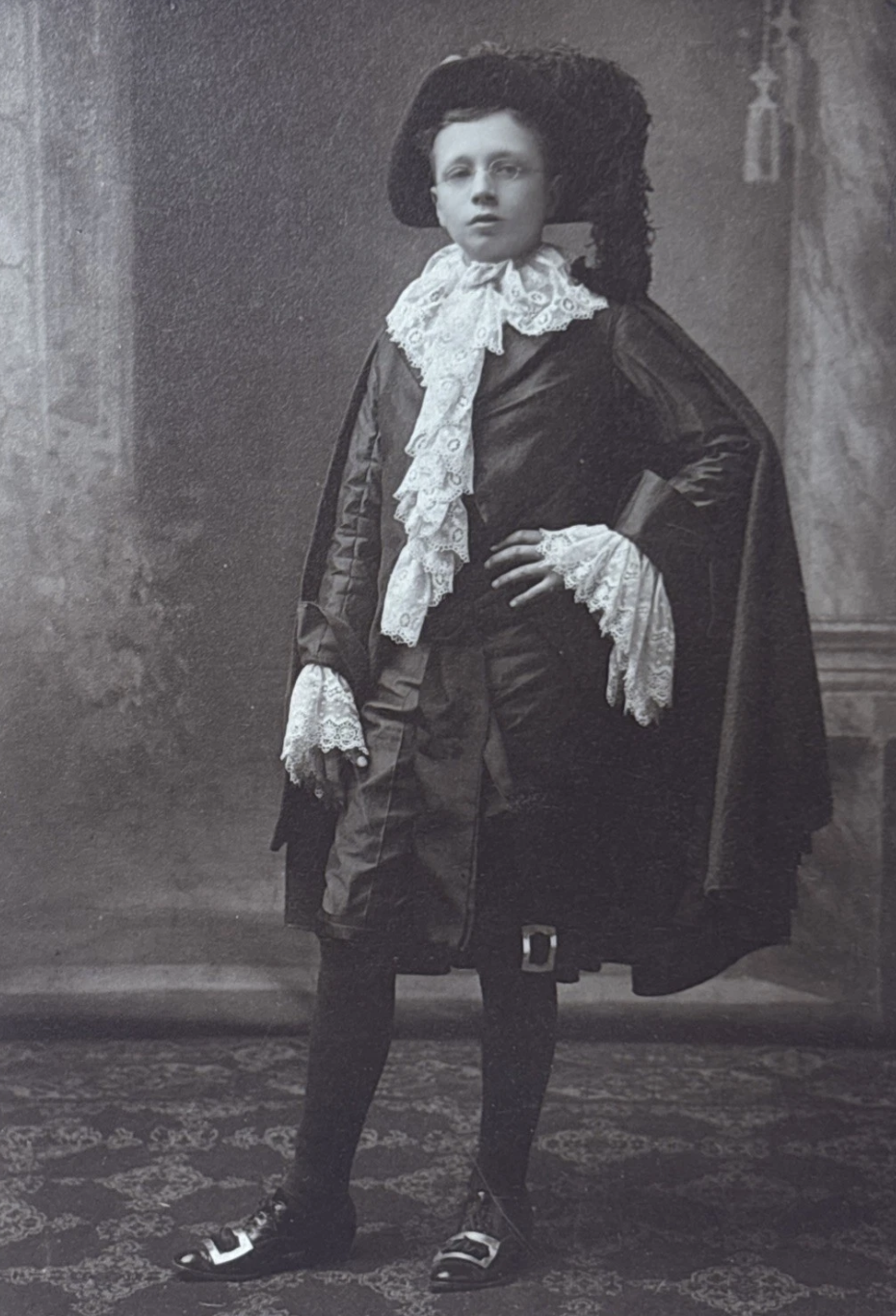
Margaret Isabel's son Charles Roderick McHenry in New York City, photographed in 1899 by Mrs. J. B. Lewis

At the League's 1924 national convention in Edmonton, McHenry was seated at the head table for the closing banquet with Lieutenant Governor of Alberta Robert Brett, Archbishop Henry Joseph O'Leary and national officers of the League, and delivered the toast entitled "Our Men." She was elected treasurer in 1926 and vice-president in 1927. In 1928, McHenry was part of a Canadian Papal Delegation from Montreal visiting Rome, Lourdes, and Lisieuk who received a Papal blessing from Pope Pius XI.

McHenry was elected president of the Catholic Women's League of Canada on 16 October 1930 by a majority of 300 delegates following a three day convention held in Kingston, Ontario. The election corresponded with the league's tenth annual convention and was opened by the Archbishop of Kingston Michael Joseph O'Brien.

As president, McHenry chaired the multi-day 11th Annual CWLC Conference beginning on 21 October 1931 in Prescott, Ontario, and gave the opening remarks. During the second day of the conference, leadership of the CWLC travelled by motorcade to the McHenry family compound on the St. Lawrence River where a banquet was held and described as "the most enjoyable and successful functions ever held under the auspicious of the League." A vocal supporter of Mrs. McHenry's presidency was Mrs. Grace Elliott Trudeau, wife of businessman Charles-Émile Trudeau and mother of Canadian Prime Minister Pierre Trudeau.

== Philanthropy ==
During the First World War, McHenry was involved in wartime charitable work. In 1916, she was elected second vice-president of the Women's Patriotic League in Brockville.

McHenry was a longtime benefactor of the CWLC, which coincided with her formal roles in the League. She was a regular donor to the Girl Guides of Canada and provided scholarships to Catholic school students in the Walkerville, Ontario School District.

== Public and social life ==
In 1924, Margaret Isabel McHenry was among the guests at a state dinner at Rideau Hall hosted by Governor General Lord Byng of Vimy and Lady Byng in honour of Edward, Prince of Wales (later King Edward VIII).

In 1930, McHenry and her daughter, Margaret Isabel "Babe" McDonald (née McHenry), were received in a private papal audience by Pope Pius XI at the Apostolic Palace in Vatican City.

== Death and funeral ==
Margaret Isabel McHenry died on 26 May 1932, with her funeral held at the McHenry waterfront residence "Fairyland" on 28 May 1932. On 7 October 1932, the CWLC held its annual conference, that year in Gananoque, Ontario, where delegates remembered their late president Mrs. McHenry in "high esteem" and offered a Requiem Mass in her honour. McHenry was interred alongside her late husband William John "W.J." McHenry at St Francis Xavier Cemetery in Brockville, Ontario.
