= Michael Doheny Jr. =

- Photographed by Hoffman & Mader in Schenectady, New York
- Born: 28 May 1817; County Tipperary, Ireland
- Died: 2 February 1886 (aged 68); Point Saint Charles, Quebec
- Burial place: Cimetière Notre-Dame-des-Neiges, Montreal, Canada
- Other name: Michael Doheny
- Citizenship: American
- Occupations: Land developer Industrial contractor
- Political party: Democratic Party; Irish Parliamentary Party
- Spouse: Alice Ryan
- Children: Margaret Isabel McHenry (daughter); Hugh Doheny (son); Michael Doheny Jr. (son); William Doheny (son); Patrick Doheny (son); John Doheny (son)
- Parents: Michael William Doheny Sr. (father); Bridget Mara (mother)
- Relatives: Patrick "Pat" Doheny (brother); Edward L. Doheny (nephew); Hugh Ryan (railway magnate) (brother-in-law); John Ryan (railway magnate) (brother-in-law); William John "W.J." McHenry (son-in-law)

Michael Doheny Jr. (28 May 1817 – 2 February 1886) was an Irish-American land developer, industrial contractor, and investor whose commercial interests extended across Canada and the United States. Beginning with property acquisitions in New York State during the 1840s, he subsequently became involved in large-scale Canadian and American construction projects, through the railway enterprises of his brothers-in-law, The Honourable Hugh Ryan and John Ryan. His business activities encompassed land development, railway infrastructure, investment in contracting firms, ranching interests, and hotel ownership in Toronto and Montreal.

Doheny was the younger son of Irish rebel Michael Doheny Sr., husband of Canadian heiress Alice Ryan, father of infrastructure contractor Hugh Doheny and philanthropist Margaret Isabel McHenry, and uncle of American oil tycoon Edward L. Doheny. His funeral in Montreal received coverage in The Gazette and was attended by over four hundred people from Canada, the United States, and Ireland, including the sitting Speaker of the United States House of Representatives and the Governor General of Canada.

== Early life and background ==
Born in County Tipperary, Ireland, on 28 May 1817, Doheny was the younger of two sons of Michael William Doheny Sr., a participant in the Irish Rebellion of 1803, and Bridget Mara of Ballynahinch. Alongside his elder brother Patrick "Pat" Doheny, he emigrated to Labrador, Canada, where the brothers worked in the whaling and sealing industries, including expeditions to Baffin Bay, before Patrick settled in Fond du Lac, Wisconsin, with his wife Eleanor Elizabeth Doheny (née Quigley). Their son, Edward L. Doheny (1856–1935), later became an American oil tycoon implicated in the 1920s Teapot Dome scandal involving the administration of President Warren G. Harding.

Doheny's cousin and namesake, Lieutenant Colonel Michael Doheny, was a lawyer, co-founder of the Irish Republican Brotherhood, and author of The Felon's Track, who also settled in New York. In 1859, Doheny provided financial backing to his cousin and John O'Mahony for the establishment of their short-lived Fenian newspaper, The Phoenix; instances of mistaken identity in contemporary press led newspapers to often distinguish the two cousins as "Col. Doheny" and "Mr. Doheny," respectively.

== New York politics ==
During the decade preceding the American Civil War, Doheny participated in Democratic Party politics in New York State, attending political gatherings and publicly supporting Democratic candidates. On 15 November 1852, he attended a victory dinner hosted by the Young Men's Democratic Union Club at Tammany Hall, following the election of Franklin Pierce as President of the United States and Horatio Seymour as the Governor of New York. Contemporary reporting in The New York Times identified Doheny among those seated at the principal table, alongside Governor-elect Seymour, John Van Buren, Augustus Schell, John Cochrane, and other Democratic figures.

On 23 September 1853, Doheny was named as a prospective speaker at a Tammany Hall meeting of the Softshell Democrats, a faction of the New York Democratic Party, convened to ratify the nominations adopted at the party's Syracuse convention. The advertised speakers included Governor Horatio Seymour, former Vice-President of the United States George M. Dallas, and William L. Marcy.

On 12 May 1854, Doheny filed a declaration of intention to become a naturalized American citizen before the New York Court of Common Pleas.

Doheny was among those invited to address a Democratic county ratification meeting at Tammany Hall, scheduled for 29 October 1857 in support of the party's county and judicial nominations. Other speakers included James T. Brady, Sanford E. Church, Amasa J. Parker, and Daniel E. Sickles.

On 23 November 1857, Doheny addressed a Democratic ratification meeting at Tammany Hall in support of Fernando Wood's candidacy for Mayor of New York City. Among speeches by John Kelly, John Cochrane, and A. D. Banks of Virginia, Doheny defended Wood against political opponents and criticized the intervention of the New York State Legislature in the city's municipal affairs. His remarks invoked the historical privileges of municipalities in Rome, London, and Paris, arguing that New York City had been deprived of rights and autonomy recognized even under European monarchies.

The New York Herald noted that in his concluding remarks Doheny appealed for Democratic solidarity between Northern and Southern supporters of the party, asserting that the South could expect the support of Northern Democrats if it remained loyal to Democratic principles.

Four days later, Doheny was advertised among the speakers at a Democratic mass meeting scheduled for 27 November 1857 at New York's Academy of Music, alongside Fernando Wood, Horace F. Clark, and William C. Schermerhorn. The gathering was organized to support the municipal nominations adopted at Tammany Hall and to rally Democratic associations throughout the city's wards.

In 1860, Doheny re-established his permanent residence on Rue Saint-Antoine in Montreal following the birth of Margaret Isabel, his first daughter after three sons, attending her baptism at Notre-Dame Basilica as his documented involvement in New York politics ended.

== Business career ==
Between 1845 and 1847, Doheny acquired three properties in New York State, two in Albany County, including one purchased at a state-run auction, and a third in Dutchess County; these acquisitions established his American landholdings before his marriage to Alice Ryan in 1852 and his subsequent involvement in the railway enterprises of her younger brothers, Hugh and John Ryan.

Doheny's Gothic Revival family residence on College Street, Toronto.

In 1856, Doheny was working as a building contractor with his brothers-in-law, Hugh and John Ryan, whose firm, H. & J. Ryan, undertook railway contracts on the Brockville and Ottawa Railway, including sections between Smiths Falls and Perth, and between Arnprior and Bonnechere; Doheny's responsibilities included constructing freight-loading platforms, storage sheds, cookhouses and associated housing.

During the American Civil War, the Ryan brothers expanded from Canada into the United States beginning in 1861 amid a shortage of domestic railway contractors. Doheny accompanied Hugh Ryan, a principal of both H. & J. Ryan and Brooks, Foster, Ryan & Co., on projects in Illinois, Michigan, Maine, and Kentucky, including the Chicago and Alton Railway, where he constructed temporary housing and other supporting facilities for railway construction, receiving payment in gold bullion or land, through which he accumulated property holdings in the United States.

In 1871, Doheny was recorded in the Canadian census as working as a railway contractor in addition to land development; he maintained a townhouse within his complex of commercial properties in Montreal's Point-Saint-Charles district, adjacent to the extended family's railway yards along the Lachine Canal, with adjoining housing occupied by employees.

Following the completion of the Brown, Brooks & Ryan contract for the Division Q of the Intercolonial Railway in 1875, two years behind schedule, Doheny began to withdraw from active contracting while suffering from a chronic respiratory condition characterized by recurrent hemoptysis. He retained ownership of his commercial properties, delegating their day-to-day management and invested in the ventures of his sons, Hugh and Michael, who often worked with their uncle Hugh Ryan and his son John Thomas Ryan.

Despite no longer accepting independent contracts, Doheny undertook a final development commission from Hugh Ryan for the Dominion Cattle Company, established in 1882 by Ryan, William Herring, J.P. Wiser, Rufus Henry Pope, A.W. Ogilvie, and William Bullock Ives, spanning 500,000 acres in present-day Oklahoma and Texas, in which Doheny also held a minority shareholding. On these projects, he brough in his son Michael to oversee the construction of additional fencing, ranch buildings, bunkhouses, corrals, livestock shelters, and permanent residential structures.

By late 1882, Doheny was the principal investor in his son Hugh Doheny's railway contracting firm, Hugh Doheny & Co., which The Gazette reported had secured a contract for construction of the Canadian Pacific Railway's main line north of Lake Superior; work commenced in 1884 under the supervision of Doheny and Hugh Ryan, then serving as Superintendent of Construction for the Toronto–Ottawa line. The firm subsequently worked as a subcontractor to Hugh Ryan & Co. on the Sault Ste. Marie Canal, in Ontario, for which the latter firm held a contract valued at $1.2 million.

In 1884, Doheny expanded his commercial interests into the hotel business, acquiring a stake in John Holderness's Albion Hotel in Toronto, situated opposite St. Lawrence Market and immediately south of the fashionable residential district along Jarvis Street. That same year, he opened the Doheny Hotel on St. Étienne Street in Montreal, one block from his Point-Saint-Charles property complex, providing accommodation for visiting railway officials and businessmen associated with the nearby Grand Trunk Railway yards; The Gazette described the establishment as one of the city's leading hotels.

== Marriage and family ==
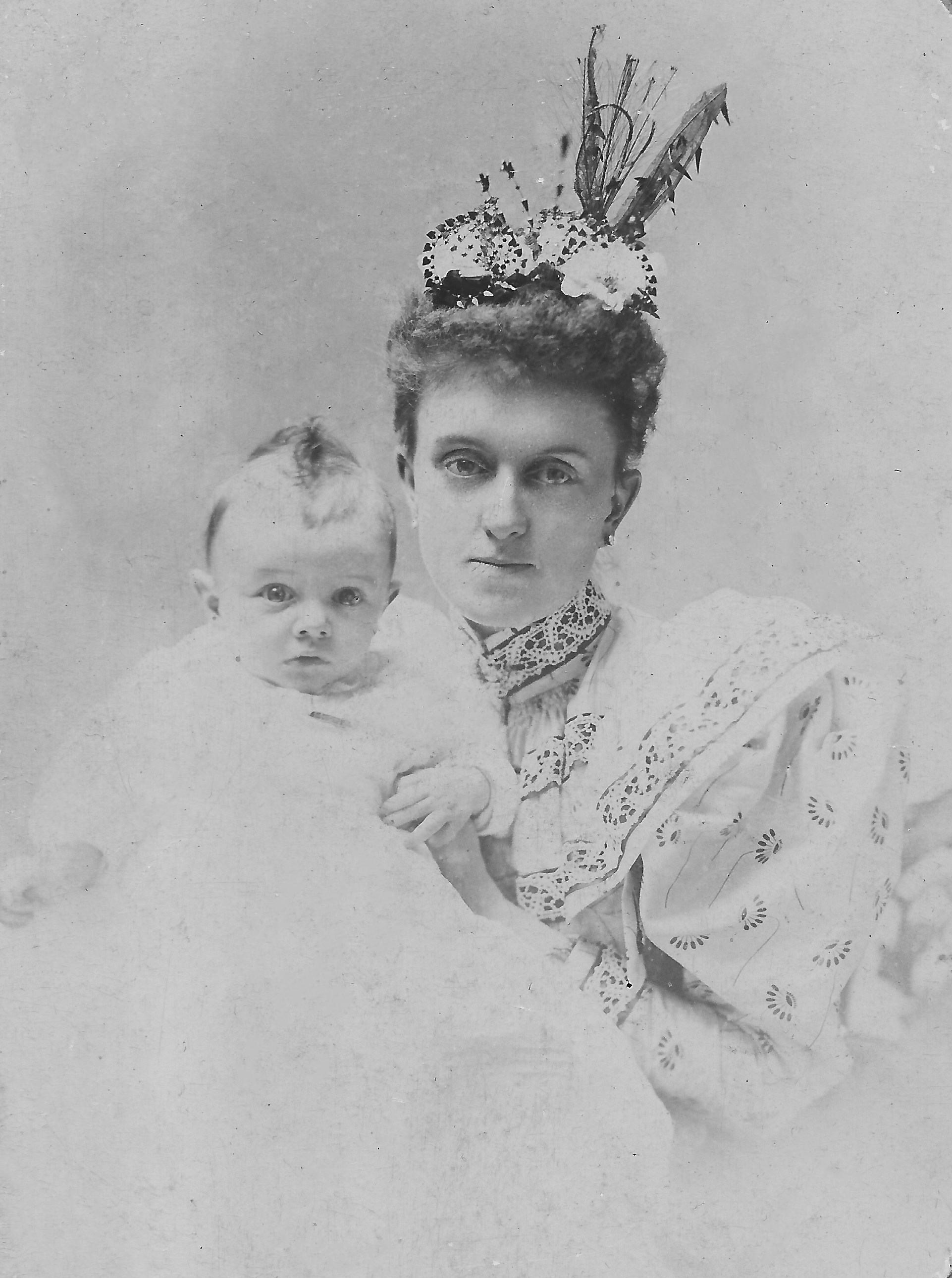
Doheny's wife Alice Ryan, with their son Hugh Doheny, namesake of her brother Hugh Ryan.

Doheny was introduced to his future wife, Alice Ryan, a Canadian heiress thirteen years his junior, through her brother, railway magnate Hugh Ryan, with whom he shared an interest in Irish nationalism and later support for the Irish Parliamentary Party. The couple married in 1852 in a Roman Catholic ceremony at the Notre-Dame Basilica in Montreal. They had six children: Margaret Isabel, Hugh, Michael, William, Patrick, and John. The family's principal residence was on Rue Saint-Antoine in Montreal, supplemented by a Gothic Revival residence on College Street in Toronto.

Two of their sons worked in Canadian railway and canal construction. Hugh Doheny (b.1863) undertook projects including Section III of the New Welland Ship Canal, for which his firm received a contract valued at $9.5 million in 1913. Their youngest son, Michael Doheny (b.1866), worked with his maternal uncles on railway construction projects involving the Canadian Pacific Railway, the Temiskaming and Northern Ontario Railway, the Inverness Railway in Cape Breton Island, as well as the Soulanges Canal along the Saint Lawrence River. Michael also served as the first president of the Federal Hockey League, later known as the National Hockey Association.

Their only daughter, Margaret Isabel Doheny (b.1860), married American William John "W.J." McHenry, a former professional lacrosse player and whiskey magnate, in November 1885. Margaret Isabel would go on to become the president of the Catholic Women's League of Canada and received a private papal audience by Pope Pius XI in 1930 at the Apostolic Palace in Vatican City.

== Death and funeral ==
Doheny died on 2 February 1886, aged 68, at his townhouse on St. Columban Street in Point-Saint-Charles, which formed part of a larger complex of his interconnected commercial properties beside the extended family's industrial railway yards along the Lachine Canal, rather than his principal Rue Saint-Antoine residence.

His funeral was held on 4 February 1886 at St Ann's Church in Griffintown, Montreal, where a Solemn Requiem Mass was celebrated with a full choir, black liturgical vestments, candlelight, and the singing of the Dies Irae. The principal celebrant was Reverend Father Strubbe, assisted by Father Napoléon Caron as deacon and American Monsignor Thomas John Capel as subdeacon; The Gazette reported that the altar and church interior had been draped in black mourning cloth.

The funeral was attended by approximately four hundred people from Canada, the United States, and Ireland, including his brother-in-laws, Hugh Ryan and John Ryan.; John G. Carlisle, Speaker of the United States House of Representatives; Henry Petty-Fitzmaurice, 5th Marquess of Lansdowne and Governor General of Canada; Canadian Senator Henry Joseph Cloran; New York philanthropist, William C. Schermerhorn; American jurist Thomas H. Doyle; and former Quebec alderman turned hotelier Denis Tansey. Among the chief mourners were Canadian Senator John Costigan, Member of Parliament John Joseph Curran, and P.J. Kennedy, grandfather of U.S. President John F. Kennedy. Following the service, Doheny was interred at Notre Dame des Neiges Cemetery in Montreal.

Doheny left an estate valued at just under half a million dollars, comprising property holdings in Quebec and Ontario, having distributed much of his liquid wealth among his children during his lifetime, including a dowry provided to his daughter Margaret Isabel McHenry upon her marriage in 1885 one year prior to his death.
