= Edward L. Doheny =

American oil tycoon (1856-1935)

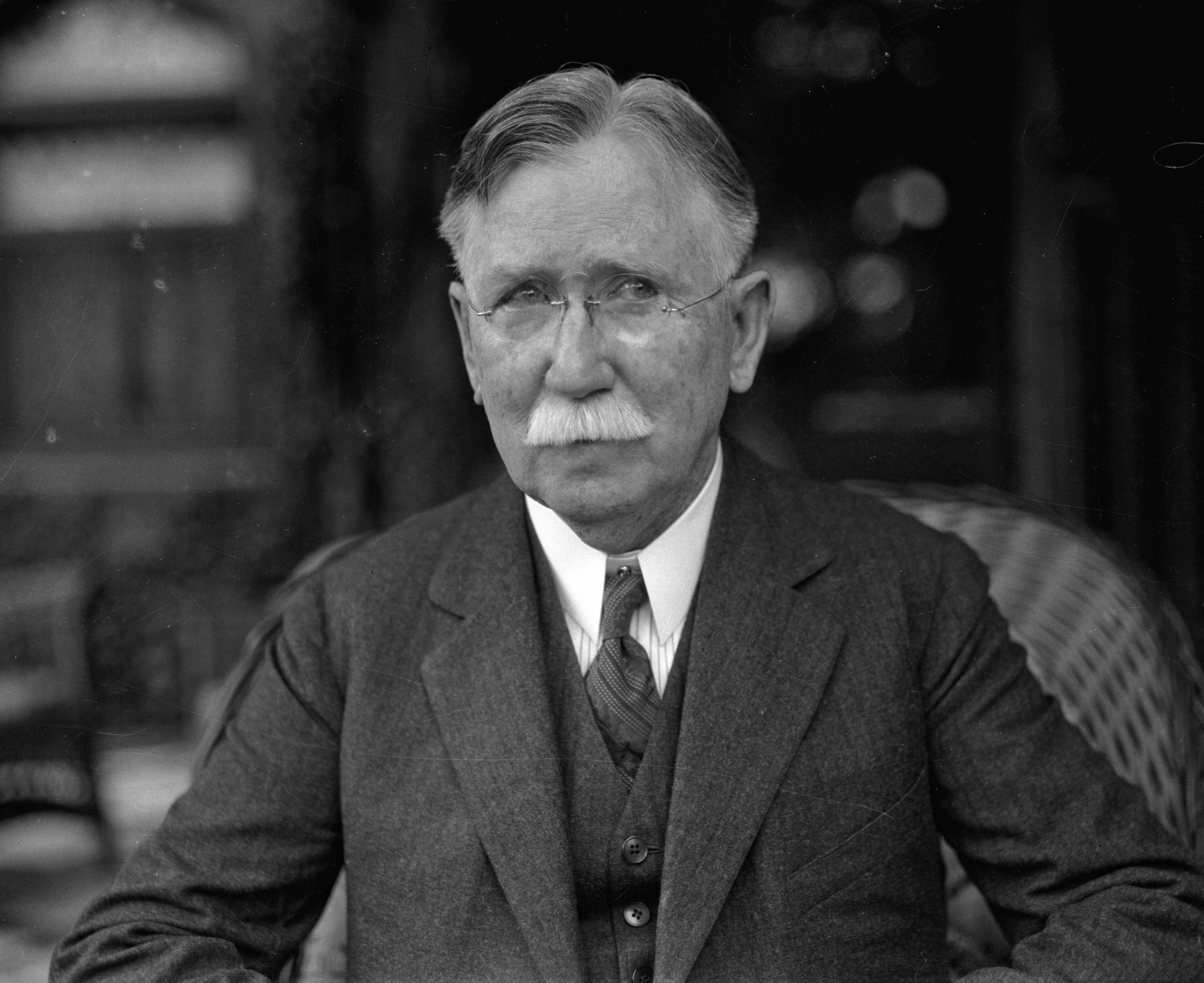
- Doheny, 1920s
- Born: Edward Laurence Doheny; August 10, 1856; Fond du Lac, Wisconsin, U.S.
- Died: September 8, 1935 (aged 79); Los Angeles, California, U.S.
- Occupations: Miner; prospector; driller; businessman; philanthropist
- Spouses: Carrie Louella Wilkins (m. 1862–1899) Carrie Estelle Betzold (m. 1875)
- Children: Edward (Ned) L. Doheny Jr. (1893–1929); Eileen Doheny (1884–1892)
- Parents: Patrick Doheny (father); Eleanor Elizabeth Quigley (mother)
- Relatives: Michael Doheny Jr. (uncle); Alice Ryan (aunt); Margaret Isabel McHenry (first cousin)

Edward Laurence Doheny (/doʊˈhiːni/; August 10, 1856 – September 8, 1935) was an American oil tycoon who, in 1892, drilled the first successful oil well in the Los Angeles City Oil Field. His success set off a petroleum boom in Southern California, and made him a fortune.

In 1902, he sold his properties, then began highly profitable oil operations in Tampico, Mexico, drilling the first well in the nation in 1901. He developed Mexico's "golden belt" there, expanded operations during the Mexican Revolution, and opened large new oil fields in Lake Maracaibo, Venezuela. His holdings developed as the Pan American Petroleum & Transport Company, one of the largest oil companies in the world in the 1920s.

In the 1920s, Doheny was implicated in the Teapot Dome scandal and accused of offering a $100,000 bribe to United States Secretary of the Interior Albert Fall. Doheny was twice acquitted of offering the bribe, but Fall was convicted of accepting it.

Doheny and his second wife and widow, Carrie Estelle Betzold, were noted philanthropists in Los Angeles, especially regarding Catholic schools, churches and charities. The character J. Arnold Ross in Upton Sinclair's 1926-27 novel Oil! (itself the inspiration for the 2007 film There Will Be Blood) is loosely based on Doheny.

== Background ==
Edward L. Doheny was born in 1856 in Fond du Lac, Wisconsin, to Patrick "Pat" and Eleanor Elizabeth "Ellen" (née Quigley) Doheny. The family was Irish Catholic. His father and a young brother Michael Doheny Jr. were born in County Tipperary Ireland and later immigrated to Canada due to rising civil unrest. Their father, Michael Doheny Sr was, by Doheny's own account, embroiled in the Irish rebellion of 1803.

His father Patrick tried whaling after reaching Labrador and later became a seal-fisher in Baffin's Bay for a decade. His mother was born in St. John's, Newfoundland, and was a school teacher. After Patrick and Ellen married and moved to Wisconsin in 1831, Doheny's father became a construction laborer and gardener. His uncle Michael became a land developer in Ontario. Quebec, Oklahoma, and the State of New York.

Doheny graduated from high school at age 15, and was named the valedictorian of his class. Following his father's death several months afterward, Doheny was employed by the U.S. Geological Survey. In 1873 he was sent to Kansas with a party to survey and subdivide the Kiowa-Comanche lands. The following year he left the Geological Survey to pursue his fortune prospecting, first in the Black Hills of South Dakota, and then in Arizona Territory and New Mexico Territory.

== Early career ==
Doheny is listed in the 1880 United States census as a painter living in Prescott, Arizona. Later in 1880, he was in the Black Range in western Sierra County of south-western New Mexico Territory, living in the rough silver-mining town of Kingston (about 10 miles (16 km) west of Hillsboro), prospecting, mining, and buying and trading mining claims. He worked in the famed Iron King mine, just north of Kingston, which drew men to the area. In Kingston, he met two men who later played important roles in his life: Albert Fall, the future Secretary of the Interior, and Charles A. Canfield, who became his business partner.

Doheny and Canfield together worked the former's Mount Chief Mine with little success. In 1883, Doheny met and married his first wife, Carrie Louella Wilkins, in Kingston on August 7. In 1886, Canfield prospected further in the Kingston area, leasing and developing with great success the Comstock Mine (not to be confused with the Comstock Lode of Virginia City, Nevada). Doheny declined to join him in this venture, but Canfield made a small fortune from it. Doheny's daughter, Eileen, was born in December 1885. Doheny was eventually reduced to doing odd jobs (including painting again) to support his family.

In the Spring of 1891, Doheny left New Mexico and moved to Los Angeles, California, attracted by Canfield's success in real estate there. Canfield had previously left New Mexico with $110,000 in cash from his Comstock Mine venture, which he parlayed into extensive real estate holdings during the Los Angeles boom of the later 1880s. With the collapse of the speculative fever, Canfield lost his wealth and land holdings and, by the time Doheny arrived in Los Angeles later in 1891, he was deeply in debt.

The two men briefly tried prospecting in the San Diego County area of Southern California, forming the Pacific Gold and Silver Extracting Company there. Failing to find success, they soon returned to Los Angeles. By 1892, Doheny was so poor he could not afford to pay for his boarding room.

Doheny's daughter Eileen was a frail child and died at age seven on December 14, 1892, from heart disease stemming from rheumatic fever and a lung infection. Edward and Carrie's marriage was fragile, owing mostly to the harsh mining life and chronic, often severe, financial problems. Eileen's death further strained the marriage. Nearly a year after Eileen's death, on November 6, 1893, Carrie gave birth to their only son, Edward Jr., known as Ned.

== Oil wells and success ==
While in Los Angeles, Doheny found out that there were local reserves of natural asphalt, which in places came to the surface—notably at the La Brea Tar Pits. Doheny obtained a lease near downtown with $400 in financing from Canfield. In the fall of 1892, Doheny dug a well with picks, shovels, and a windlass, looking for asphalt, from which oil could be refined. When the well (6 by 4 feet (1.8 m × 1.2 m) wide) reached 155 feet (47 m), Doheny devised a drilling system involving a eucalyptus tree trunk. When completed in 1893, the well reached 225 feet (69 m) and produced 40 barrels per day (6.4 m^{3}/d).

Edward and Carrie Doheny divorced in 1899, when Ned was six years old. Edward gained custody of their son, and remarried. Unable to cope with her losses, the following year Carrie Doheny committed suicide. Doheny married his second wife, Carrie "Estelle" Betzold, inside the private Pullman car of Santa Fe Railway executive Almon Porter Maginnis ("Car 214"). It was held on the siding in New Mexico Territory on August 22, 1900. Though she bore no children, Carrie raised Ned.

The first oil well dug in Los Angeles was in 1863, on Hoover Street between Seventh Street and Wilshire Boulevard, by a man named Baker. However, in his book Petroleum in California: A Concise and Reliable History of the Oil Industry of the State, Lionel V. Redpath says the Los Angeles oil industry began with the Doheny and Canfield well at the corner of Patton and West State streets. The well was a small producer, but it pumped steadily for three years, and during that time Doheny and others sunk about three hundred more wells. Doheny and Canfield soon made a fortune by drilling in the area and selling the oil to nearby factories. Later, they helped spur the California oil boom of the early 1900s by persuading railroads to switch from coal to oil to power their locomotives.

Doheny was also a pioneering oil producer in Mexico. His company drilled the country's first well, in Tampico, in 1901. It expanded operations during the Mexican Revolution, and opened large new oil fields in Mexico's "golden belt" inland from Tampico. It also drilled Cerro Azul No. 4 well—which, in February 1916, became the world's largest-producer, pumping 260,000 barrels per day (B.P.D.). When the well—drilled by Herbert Wylie—came in, the sound could be heard 16 miles (26 km) away in Casiano, and it shot a stream of oil 598 feet (182 m) into the air, sending oil in a two-mile (three-kilometre) radius. Over the next fourteen years, the well produced over fifty-seven million barrels.

== Big business and Teapot Dome scandal ==
Doheny formed the Pan American Petroleum and Transport Company (P.A.T.)—part of which later became the Mexican Petroleum Company (Pemex)—to hold his two Mexican companies (Mexican Petroleum and Huasteca), his Atlantic and Gulf Coasts facilities in the United States, and his California holdings. The company owned 600,000 acres (240,000 ha) of land worth about $50,000,000 and secured an additional 800,000 acres (320,000 ha) in Mexico in October 1919.

In 1919 the Colombian Petroleum Company, a P.A.T. subsidiary, bought a 75% interest in the Barco oil concession in Colombia. Doheny was also interested in plans to develop the oil industry in Venezuela, and in building a pipeline from Colombia to Venezuela to make it more economical to export the Barco oil from the west coast of Lake Maracaibo. In 1920 Pan American was the largest oil company in the United States, ahead of Sinclair Consolidated Oil Corporation and Standard Oil Company of Indiana. Automobile production was booming and oil prices were high. The Mexican Petroleum Company was the largest in Mexico, and Mexico was the largest oil producer in the world. By 1925, Doheny's net worth was $100 million ($1.84 billion in 2025 dollars), more at the time than John D. Rockefeller.

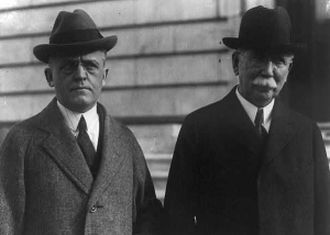
Doheny poses with his lawyer Frank J. Hogan, 1924

In 1922 Albert B. Fall, U.S. Secretary of the Interior, leased the oil field at Elk Hills, California, to the Pan American Petroleum & Transport Company. Around the same time, the Teapot Dome Field in Wyoming was leased to Sinclair Consolidated Oil Corporation. Both oilfields were part of the US Navy's petroleum reserves. Neither lease was subject to competitive bidding. In 1924 rumors about corruption in the deals escalated into the Teapot Dome scandal.

Doheny's reputation was somewhat tainted by a bribe he evidently paid to Fall in 1921. He made the "gift" of $100,000 in connection with obtaining a lease of 32,000 acres (13,000 ha) of government-owned land used for the Elk Hills Naval Petroleum Reserve near Taft, California. The resulting scandal broke soon after that, over similar bribes Fall accepted for leasing Teapot Dome in Wyoming. Doheny was charged with bribing Fall but, in 1930, was acquitted. His son, Ned, who had delivered the money, and assistant Hugh Plunkett were also charged, but died before they could be tried. Nevertheless, Fall was convicted of accepting the bribe.

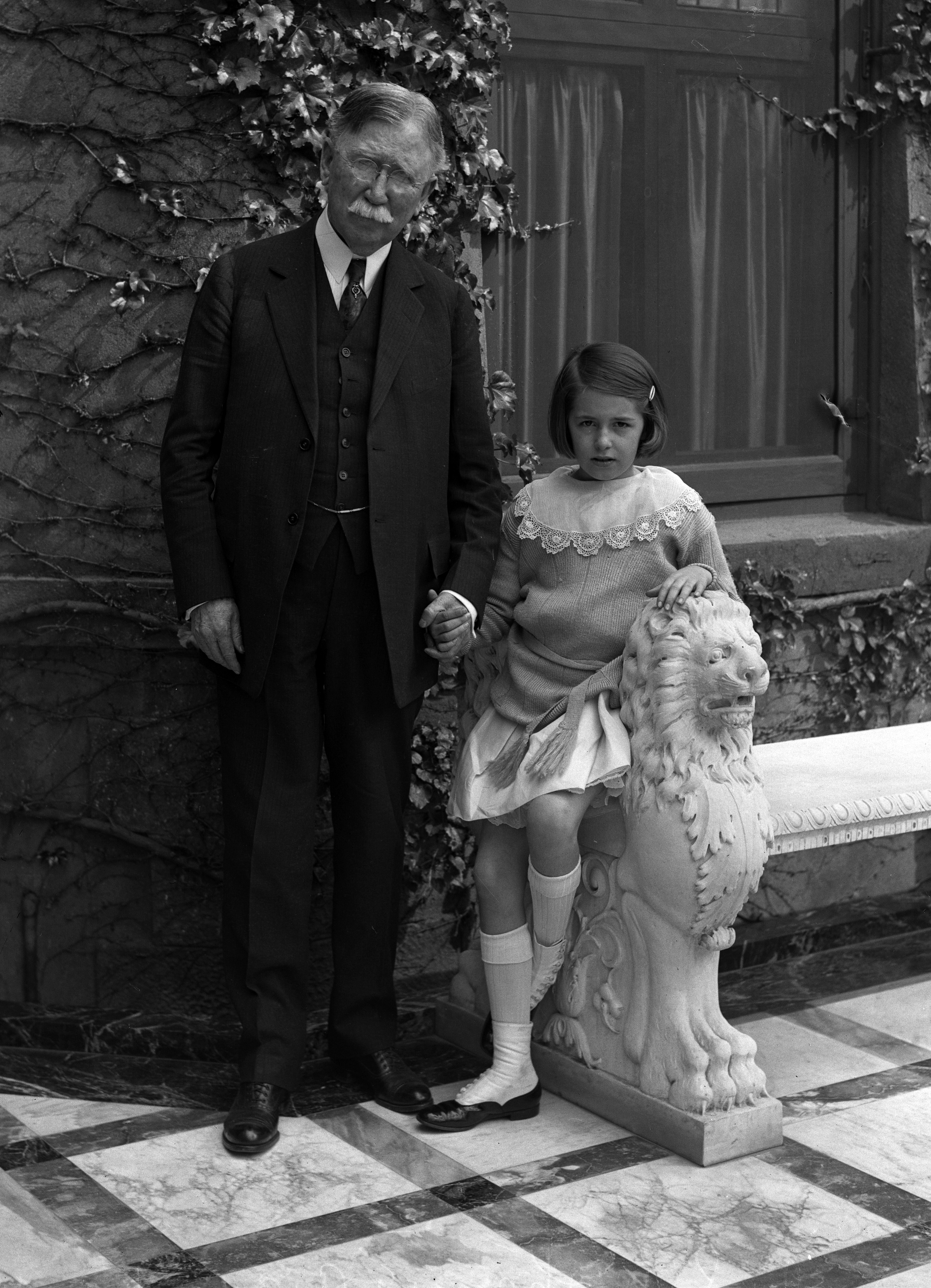
Doheny and his granddaughter, Lucy Estelle, c. 1928

Doheny sold a majority of the family's shares in Pan American Petroleum & Transport to Standard Oil of Indiana in April 1925, but retained all California assets, which he formed into a new company, Pan American Western Petroleum Company. Pan American Eastern Petroleum (the Mexico holdings, the Atlantic and Gulf Coasts holdings in the U.S., refineries, pipelines, and thirty-one tankers), which held the non-California assets, was sold to Standard. Pan American Western returned to its roots as an "upstream" exploration and production company.

At the end of 1925, after Doheny had given up control of Pan American Petroleum & Transport, in order to exploit the oilfields in Lake Maracaibo, Venezuela, the company gained control of Lago Petroleum Corporation from C. Ledyard Blair's Blair & Co. The transaction became the subject of a stockholder action in 1933, which alleged that the bankers, who were represented on the Pan American board, conspired to make excessive profits. In 1926, Venezuelan Eastern Petroleum Corporation reorganized as a subsidiary of Pan American Eastern to buy and develop Venezuelan oil properties. But Doheny was not materially involved, except passively through his remaining minority position in Pan American Petroleum & Transport.

In the midst of the Teapot Dome scandal, Doheny gifted the family home, Greystone Mansion, to his son Ned and his wife Lucy Marceline Smith, who had married on June 10, 1914. He built the 46,000-square-foot (4,300 m^{2}) house in 1928, at a cost of $3,188,000, and sold the property and accompanying 400-acre (1.6 km^{2}) ranch to his son for a nominal $10.

When a second criminal trial for bribery began to loom for Doheny and Fall in 1929, the pressure on all parties reached a breaking point. The Dohenys tried to persuade Hugh Plunkett to be committed to a mental institute so that he could not then be made to testify against them. On February 16 an argument broke out at about 10pm between Ned and Plunkett, Ned shot Plunkett and then himself. There were rumors that the two were having an affair. The full story was never clear. The police were not called until three hours after the shots had been fired, despite several members of the family being at home and having heard the yelling. The Los Angeles authorities immediately blamed Plunkett in the murder-suicide. In addition to the indictment of Edward Doheny in the Teapot Dome scandal, both Doheny and Plunkett had been indicted in the alleged bribe of Fall - as Ned (accompanied by Plunkett) had delivered the money. They had already gone through some trials.

Raymond Chandler, a former oil man, included a thinly veiled account of this event in one chapter of his novel The High Window, presenting it as a bygone, hushed-up case. He had started work for the Dabney Oil Syndicate in 1922 as a bookkeeper and auditor, but was fired a decade later.

Beset by shareholder lawsuits in the wake of Teapot Dome, and the death of Ned, Doheny became a recluse and invalid. When she realized her husband needed an undisturbed home away for a while after the Teapot Dome travails and Ned's death, Carrie Estelle asked architect Wallace Neff to design and build the Ferndale Ranch complex on their Ojai, California property. In less than six weeks Neff drew blueprints and hundreds of workers completed the 9,000 square feet (840 m^{2}) house by working day and night.

== Personal life & family ==
Doheny's grandparents on both sides came from Ireland, with his paternal grandparents being Michael William Doheny Sr and Bridget Doheny (née Mara), hailing from Ballingarry; and maternal grandparents being Patrick Quigley and Ann Quigley (née Conoly) hailing from Roscommon.

In 1883, Doheny met and married his first wife, Carrie Louella Wilkins, in Kingston on August 7.

Doheny and his first wife, Carrie Louella Wilkins, had a daughter, Eileen, born in December 1885, a frail child that died at age seven on December 14, 1892, from heart disease stemming from rheumatic fever and a lung infection. Edward and Carrie's marriage was fragile, owing mostly to the harsh mining life and chronic, often severe, financial problems. Eileen's death further strained the marriage.

Nearly a year after Eileen's death, on November 6, 1893, Carrie gave birth to their only son, Edward L. ("Ned") Doheny Jr., owner of Greystone Mansion and the namesake of Doheny Library at the University of Southern California. He died in 1929.

Carrie Louella Doheny and Edward divorced in 1899, when Ned was six years old. Edward gained custody of their son, and remarried. Unable to cope with her losses, the following year Carrie Doheny committed suicide. Doheny married his second wife, Carrie "Estelle" Betzold, inside the private Pullman car of Santa Fe Railway executive Almon Porter Maginnis ("Car 214"). It was held on the siding in New Mexico Territory on August 22, 1900. Though she bore no children, Carrie raised Ned.

Through Ned's children, Doheny is the great-grandfather of science fiction writer Larry Niven and singer-songwriter Ned Doheny.

Doheny's paternal uncle Michael Doheny Jr. married Irish-Canadian heiress Alice Ryan, sister of Canadian industrialists Hugh Ryan and John Ryan. Their daughter, Margaret Isabel McHenry (née Doheny), was his first cousin and wife of American retailer whiskey magnate William John "W.J." McHenry.

Doheny was an avid sailor and owned the steam yacht Casiana, named after his first major producing oil well in Mexico, the Casiana No. 7.

In 1922, Doheny loaned the boat to Elisha Walker, to rush Walker's brother-in-law, Abbot J. Dorn, a New York attorney, to the hospital from Martinique for a cancer surgery.

== Death ==
Edward L. Doheny died at his Beverly Hills townhouse on September 8, 1935, of natural causes, a month after his seventy-ninth birthday. His funeral was in St. Vincent's Church in Los Angeles. That year Carrie Estelle Doheny, Doheny's widow, burned hundreds of letters and business documents, what biographer Margaret Leslie Davis describes as the "written remnants of Edward Doheny's life". (p. 4)

== Philanthropy ==
The Dohenys donated to several colleges and universities. After the shooting death of his son, Ned (Edward Jr.), he donated $1.1 million in 1932 to the University of Southern California (USC) to build the Edward L. Doheny Jr. Memorial Library. Doheny Hall is on the Loyola Marymount University campus, and the Doheny Campus is one of two campuses of Mount St. Mary's College. Doheny Sr. lived in a mansion there which he had purchased in 1901 after giving away Greylock to his son Ned. It was part of Chester Place, a gated community of Victorian mansions, and by his death in 1935, Doheny ended up owning most of the houses, as well as the street. Built in 1899 in the French Gothic architectural style, the three-story, twenty-two-room residence was damaged in the 1933 earthquake but was repaired. Today, the residence is part of Mount St. Mary's College's Doheny campus.

The Dohenys also owned a great deal of coastal land in Dana Point, California, which they donated to the State of California for Doheny State Beach as a memorial to Edward's murdered son Ned. They also donated funds for the construction of St. Edward Chapel (now known as San Felipe de Jesus Chapel), which is part of St. Edward the Confessor Parish.

Doheny helped fund the construction of St. Vincent de Paul Church in Los Angeles.

After he began basing his Mexican oil operations near Tampico, Tamaulipas, in 1902, Doheny donated much money toward the construction and maintenance of the Cathedral of Tampico there. Also known as The Temple of the Immaculate Conception, it is located in Plaza de Armas in the city.

In 1944, his widow Carrie Estelle Doheny suffered a hemorrhage that left her partially blind. Realizing the value of good vision, she created and funded the Doheny Eye Institute, which has become a world leader in vision research. She became a major cultural philanthropist in Los Angeles as well. When commissioning new buildings for these civic projects, she often chose the renowned Southern California architect Wallace Neff. In 1940, she donated antiquities and funds to establish the Edward Laurence Doheny Memorial Library at St. John's Seminary in Camarillo, California.

In 1954, Estelle Doheny provided funds and "a quantity of her precious collections in the library building" at St. Mary's of the Barrens seminary in Perryville, Missouri. By November 11, 2000, the Vincentian Fathers had leased the library facility to Southeast Missouri State University, and sol "the Doheny treasures".

== Legacy ==
Numerous place names in Southern California are named for Edward Doheny:

- Doheny Drive in West Hollywood and Beverly Hills
- Doheny Road in Beverly Hills
- Doheny Circle in Irvine
- Doheny State Beach, on the Pacific coast of Orange County, at Dana Point
- The Edward Laurence Doheny Memorial Library and the Carrie Estelle Doheny Memorial Library at St. John's Seminary, Camarillo, California.
- Doheny Mansion, at Mount Saint Mary's University
- USC Doheny Memorial Library

== In popular culture ==
- Doheny's payment to Albert Fall and the scandal inspired Upton Sinclair's novel, Oil!, based in part on Doheny's life.
- Reference to Doheny Beach, in the Beach Boys song "Surfin' USA". Lyrical verse "...all over Manhattan and down Doheny way, everybody's gone surfin', surfin' USA."
- In the movie There Will Be Blood, an adaptation of the novel Oil!, the character of Daniel Plainview portrayed by Daniel Day-Lewis is loosely based on Doheny.
- In the 1964 Jan and Dean hit song, "Dead Man's Curve", the lyrics read, "He passed me at Doheny, then I started to swerve...."
- Lydell McCutcheon, a character in season 2 of HBO's Perry Mason, is loosely based on Doheny.
- Doheney's discovery of oil in his first asphalt well appears in John Jakes's novel California Gold, — as do Doheny and Canfield, as partners with the novel's fictional protagonist, Mack Chance.
