= Alice Ryan =

Irish-Canadian heiress and suffragette (1830–1906)

Alice Doheny
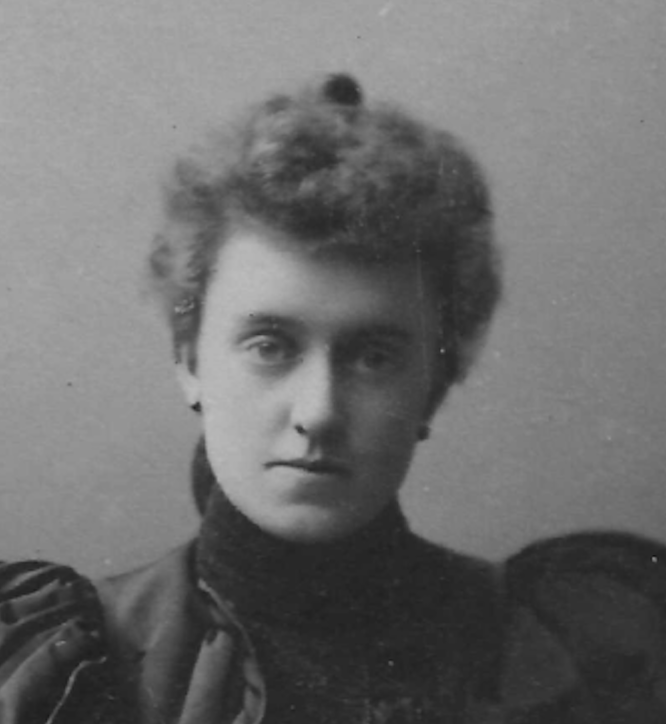
- Portrait of Alice Doheny (née Ryan)
- Born: 16 July 1830; Doon, County Limerick, Ireland
- Died: 27 October 1906 (aged 76); Brockville, Ontario, Canada
- Burial place: Cimetière Notre-Dame-des-Neiges, Montreal, Canada
- Citizenship: Canadian
- Movement: Women's suffrage
- Spouse: Michael Doheny Jr.
- Children: Margaret Isabel McHenry (daughter); Hugh Doheny (son); Michael Doheny Jr. (son); William Doheny (son); Patrick Doheny (son); John Doheny (son)
- Parents: Martin John Ryan (father); Margaret Conway (mother)
- Relatives: Hugh Ryan (railway magnate) (brother); John Ryan (brother); Edward L. Doheny (nephew); Elinor Claire Millais (grand-niece)

Alice Doheny (née Ryan; 16 July 1830 – 27 October 1906) was an Irish-Canadian heiress, suffragette, sister of railway magnates The Honourable Hugh Ryan and John Ryan; wife of land developer Michael Doheny Jr.; mother of heiress Margaret Isabel McHenry; and aunt of oil tycoon Edward L. Doheny. The daughter Martin John Ryan and Margaret Conway, Ryan moved with her family from Limerick, Ireland to Montreal, Canada, after her father sold Gortkelly Castle to another branch of the Ryan clan based in Tipperary.

== Background ==
Born on 16 July 1830, Alice Ryan was born into the Irish-Catholic Ryan family, the daughter of Martin John Ryan and Margaret Ryan (née Conway).

The family immigrated to Montreal, Canada, in 1841, when Ryan was eleven years old. She had two brothers: industrialists and railway magnates Hugh Ryan and John Ryan, known across Canada at the time for building some of the largest sections of the Canadian Pacific Railway.

== Suffragette movement ==
Alice Ryan is considered an 'elite intermediary' during the first generation of suffrage activism in Canada through her support of the Canadian Women's Suffrage Association (CWSA), previously the Toronto Woman's Literary Club (TWLC). She was a family associate of the Attorney General of Ontario, Sir Oliver Mowat —later a pall-bearer for her brother Hugh Ryan— who oversaw the 1883 committee created to urge the Toronto City Council to petition the Ontario Government to pass a bill conferring the municipal franchise upon women. The committee was composed of members of the CWSA including Dr. Emily Stowe, Sarah Anne Curzon, Jessie Turnbull McEwen, Mrs. W. B. Hamilton, Mrs. Miller, and Mrs. Isabel Mackenzie (wife of William Lyon Mackenzie).

Ryan reportedly appealed to Mowat on the committee's behalf and, following the committee's presentation, he formally stated that "there was no doubt that the franchise would have to be extended to women." As a result of the committee's petition (which was passed by the Toronto City Council 20 to 5) and Mowat's legal support, Sir John A. Macdonald introduced a bill to the Parliament of Canada that same year which stipulated granting municipal franchise to unmarried women and widows possessing the required property qualifications. The bill, which Ryan argued should have also included married women, ultimately did not pass.

== Marriage, children and descendants ==
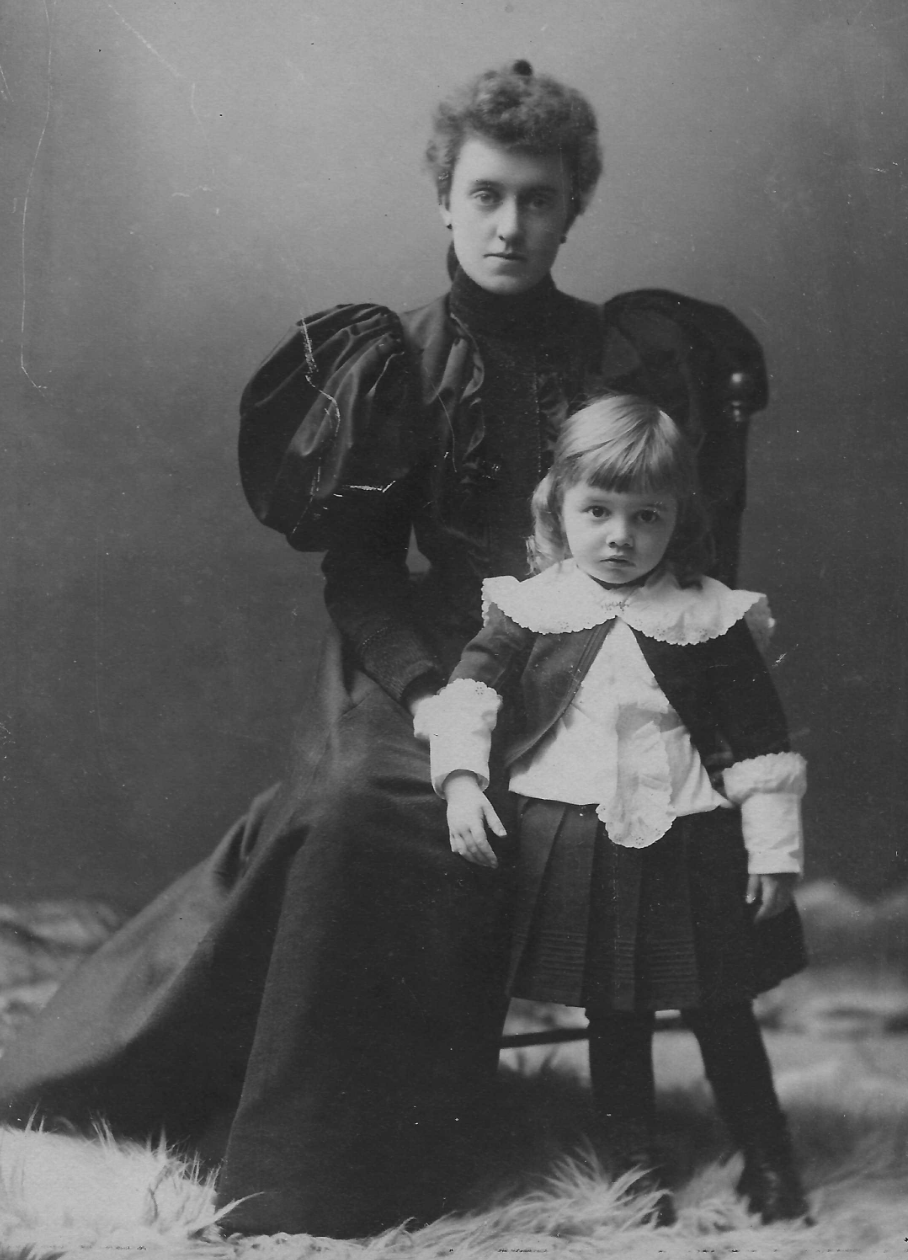
Alice Ryan pictured with her only daughter Margaret Isabel Doheny.

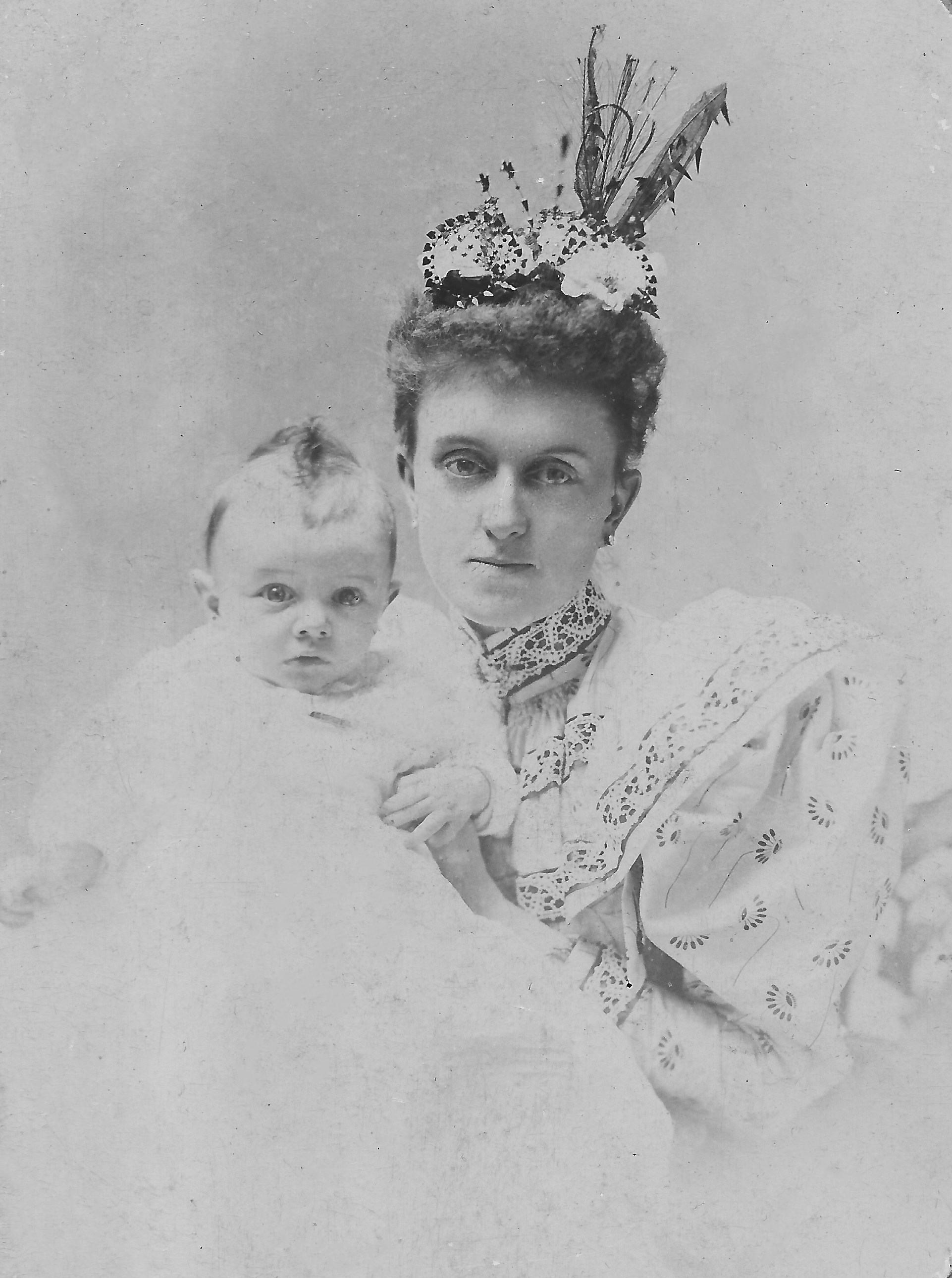
Alice Ryan pictured with her eldest son Hugh Doheny, namesake of her brother Hugh Ryan.

Alice Ryan married land developer Michael Doheny Jr., uncle of Irish-American oil tycoon Edward L. Doheny, in 1852 with a full Roman Catholic ceremony and mass at the Notre-Dame Basilica of Montreal. The couple had six children: Margaret Isabel Doheny, Hugh Doheny, Michael Doheny, William Doheny, Patrick Doheny and John Doheny. The family lived primarily at their Rue Saint-Antoine residence in Montreal, with their secondary residence being a Gothic Revival mansion on Toronto's College Street.

Ryan's son Hugh Doheny (b. 1863) would, like his father and uncles, become a developer; with his largest building project being Section III of the New Welland Ship Canal competed in 1913 for a fee of $9.5 million.

Ryan's only daughter, Margaret Isabel McHenry (née Doheny) (b.1860), who was a primary beneficiary of her mothers' estate, married American-Canadian William John "W.J." McHenry; a professional American lacrosse player turned whiskey magnate on 5 November 1885.

Ryan's youngest son, Michael Doheny (b.1866) would, like his maternal uncles with whom he worked, go on to become a "well-known railway contractor" developing and expanding sections of the Canadian Pacific Railway, as well as the Temiskaming and Northern Ontario Railway and the Inverness Railway in Cape Breton. Similarly to his elder brother Hugh, the youngest Doheny developed Canadian waterways, including the Soulanges Canal along the Saint Lawrence River. Michael was the first President of the Federal Hockey League, later known as the National Hockey Association (NHA).

Ryan's grandson Lt.-Cmdr. Hugh Doheny (b. 1914) married Harriet Katherine Lucinda Erskine (b. 1924), daughter of Lt.-Col. Sir Thomas Erskine, 4th Baronet of Combo, and Dame Magdalen Erskine (née Anstruther).

Ryan became a widow on 2 February 1886 when her husband Michael Doheny died suddenly in their Point-Saint-Charles townhouse next to his business property assemblage and near the extended family's adjacent industrial railway yards; rather than their primary Rue Saint-Antoine residence. The funeral on 4 February 1886 at St Ann's Church was attended by the Governor General of Canada, Henry Petty-Fitzmaurice, 5th Marquess of Lansdowne, and over four hundred people from Canada, America and Ireland; with chief mourners including her brothers Hugh Ryan and John Ryan; Massachusetts politician, P.J. Kennedy (grandfather of President John F. Kennedy); Speaker of the United States House of Representatives, John G. Carlisle; Canadian Senator, John Costigan; and Canadian Member of Parliament, J.J. Curran.

Ryan's grand-niece was socialite Elinor Claire Macdonell (daughter Helen Margaret "Nellie" Ryan and railway developer Allan Ronald "A.R." Macdonell), and the wife of British artist Raoul Millais; Millais being the grandson of Pre-Raphelite painter Sir John Everett Millais.

Ryan's husband Irish-American land developer Michael Doheny Jr.

== Social life ==
During the 1850s, Ryan and her husband maintained connections within New York society, including William C. Schermerhorn, an associate of Doheny's through Democratic political circles. In March of 1854, the couple attended an elaborate French-themed costume ball hosted by Schermerhorn and his wife Ann, whose residence was decorated to resemble Louis XV's court at Versailles for approximately six hundred guests.

Ryan and Anne Blunt,15th Baroness Wentworth, were distant relations by marriage and frequent companions during Ryan's visits to Egypt, including in 1904, when she visited the Baroness at Sheykh Obeyd near Cairo, accompanied by her sister-in-law Margaret Catherine Ryan (née Walsh), daughter Margaret Isabel McHenry, and nieces Mary Alice Ryan and Marguerite Teresa Ryan.

== Inheritance ==
Upon the death of her younger brother Hugh Ryan in 1899 (declared "Canada's wealthiest railroad contractor"), national newspaper The Globe and Mail reported Alice Ryan received an inheritance and income in his last will and testament; including his landholdings in Manitoba, consisting of commercial property in Winnipeg and Portage la Prairie.

The Doheny Gothic Revival mansion on College St, Toronto.

== Death and burial ==
Alice Ryan died of acute bronchitis on 27 October 1906 at her daughter Margaret Isabel's marital residence "Fairyland" in Brockville, Ontario; with her body being transported by private train to Montreal, Quebec, where the funeral service was held at the Irish-Catholic St Ann's Church. The requiem mass was attended by the entire extended Ryan-Doheny clan, as well as Gilded-Age women; including Mrs. Mary Augusta Kennedy (wife of P. J. Kennedy), and Mrs. Mary Inez Cloran (wife of Senator Henry Joseph Cloran).

Ryan was laid to rest in the Cimetière Notre-Dame-des-Neiges on 29 October 1906, alongside her late husband Michael Doheny (d.1886) and her late son Patrick Doheny (d.1890).
