= John Ryan (railway magnate) =

Irish-Canadian railway magnate

Esquire John Ryan
- Portrait taken by William Notman, 1865
- Born: 25 December 1834; Doon, County Limerick, Ireland
- Died: 21 March 1902 (aged 67); Toronto, Ontario, Canada
- Citizenship: Canadian
- Occupation: Railway magnate
- Organization: H. & J. Ryan
- Spouse: Margaret Isabella McSween
- Children: Helen Margaret "Nellie" Ryan (daughter); Isabelle Teresa "Rita" Ryan (daughter); Maj. John Raymond Ryan (son); Patrick Hugh Ryan (son); Roderick McSween Ryan (son); Charles Alexander Ryan (son)
- Parents: Martin John Ryan (father); Margaret Conway (mother)
- Relatives: Hugh Ryan (railway magnate) (brother); Alice Ryan (sister); Michael Doheny Jr. (brother-in-law); Margaret Isabel McHenry (niece); Elinor Claire Millais (granddaughter); Hugh Millais (great-grandson)

John Ryan Esq. (25 December 1834 – 21 March 1902) was a Irish-Canadian railway magnate, the younger brother of Toronto-based industrialist The Honourable Hugh Ryan and socialite Alice Ryan, and great-grandfather of British actor Hugh Millais. A 1907 biographical history of York County described Ryan as "one of the most extensive contractors in Canada; a prominent resident of Ontario and well known throughout the Dominion."

== Background ==
Born on 25 December 1834, the second son of Martin John Ryan and Margaret Conway, Ryan immigrated from Limerick, Ireland, to Montreal, Canada, in 1841 at the age of seven; after his father sold Gortkelly Castle and lands to another branch of Ryan family.

== Career at H. & J. Ryan ==
John Ryan was a co-founder and chairman of the industrial firm H. & J. Ryan, known for railway development, alongside his elder brother Hugh Ryan who served as the CEO. The firm went on to become one of the most successful in Canada and predated the formal establishment of the country.

The first development contracts were awarded to the firm in the 1850s for two large sections of the Brockville and Ottawa Railway in Ontario. Following their completion, Ryan spearheaded the firm's expansion into the United States of America in the 1860s; capitalising on the country's lack of labour availability due to the American Civil War. This strategic manoeuvre resulted in the firm securing railway contracts in Michigan, Maine, Kentucky, and Illinois; including the Chicago and Alton Railway.

In 1880, Ryan and his brother were awarded the railway development contracts for the new Pembina-St. Boniface line track, including 100 miles northwest of Winnipeg, by Sir Charles Tupper and the Manitoba provincial government. In addition to the railway development, the contracts also included the building of a covered bridge to connect the west and east portions of the Pembina-St. Boniface line across the Red River.

== Development Partnerships ==
The following list is in chronological order:

=== Ryan, Cosgrove & Booth. ===
In 1887, Ryan joined the mayor of Brockville, Ontario, David S. Booth and Prescott-based developer James Cosgrove to establish the firm Ryan, Cosgrove & Booth; which secured the contract to build the Guelph Junction Railway. The fifteen mile railway from Guelph to Campbellville and ultimately connecting with a section of the Canadian Pacific Railway.

=== Hugh Ryan & Co. ===
In 1888, Ryan joined his elder brother Hugh Ryan and Michael John Haney in establishing Hugh Ryan & Co.; which secured the contract to build the now historic Sault Ste. Marie Canal in Ontario. The specifications for the canal were changed twice during construction, thus necessitating renegotiation of the contract price with the Deputy Minister of Railways and Canals, Toussaint Trudeau (ancestor of Prime Ministers Pierre Trudeau and Justin Trudeau). The final contract price was a boon for the firm coming in at $1.2 million.

It will thus be seen that Mr. John Ryan was one of the most extensive contractors in Canada; he was also a prominent resident of Ontario, and was well known throughout the Dominion.

== Marriage, children and extended family ==
John Ryan photographed by William Notman, in 1865. Another copy is held by the McCord Stewart Museum.

On 27 July 1863 John Ryan married Scottish-Canadian Margaret Isabella McSween, fourth daughter of Roderick McSween, in a widely attended ceremony in Brockville, Ontario. The couple lived in Brockville following their marriage for three decades until 1894 when they moved, along with their four live-in house staff, into a red-brick mansion on Jarvis Street in Toronto, Ontario. They had seven children: Helen Margaret "Nellie" Ryan, Isabelle Teresa "Rita" Ryan, Maj. John Raymond Ryan, Patrick Hugh Ryan, Roderick McSween Ryan, Charles Alexander Ryan, and Hugh Alexander Ryan

Mr. and Mrs. Ryan resided in Brockville over thirty years, and were devoted and loyal citizens, deeply interested in its welfare and advancements. In 1894 they moved to a newly constructed mansion in Toronto.

Upon the death of his father-in-law on 4 September 1877, John Ryan inherited the "McSween Lands" in Brockville, Ontario, in trust to his wife Margaret Isabella Ryan (née McSween); which included several residential properties and the McSween Inn. Their daughter Isabelle Teresa Pettit (née Ryan) was still receiving payments from this Trust Fund in 1929.

On 14 June 1892, Ryan's eldest daughter Helen Margaret "Nellie" Ryan married Montreal-based railway contractor and early hydroelectric investor Allan Ronald "A.R." Macdonell in Brockville, Ontario. Their daughter Elinor Claire Macdonell married British painter Raoul Millais, grandson of Pre-Raphaelite painter Sir John Everett Millais and the son of naturalist John Guille Millais. A portrait of Elinor by Raoul is housed in the National Portrait Gallery, London.

On 3 April 1908, Ryan's younger daughter Isabelle Teresa "Rita" Ryan married Colonel Hubert Ronal Pettit —appointed Deputy Lord Lieutenant of Herefordshire by King George V— in a ceremony in Prescott, Ontario, followed by a reception on the Ryan family's private train which took the wedding attendees to Montreal, Quebec.

Both of Ryan's daughters, Helen and Isabelle, were the goddaughters of his eldest brother and business partner Hugh Ryan, owner of the Rosedale mansion Hollydene; and were subsequently beneficiaries of Hugh Ryan's sizeable estate.

Ryan's elder sister was socialite Alice Ryan, wife of Michael Doheny Jr., known for her role as an 'elite intermediary' in the women's suffragette movement and lavish lifestyle. Through his sister, Ryan was the uncle of heiress Margaret Isabel McHenry (née Doheny), the president of the Catholic Women's League of Canada. His eldest daughter, Helen Margaret "Nellie" Ryan, was the maid of honour at Margaret Isabel's society wedding to whiskey magnate William John "W.J." McHenry on 28 October 1885.

== Death, estate and funeral ==
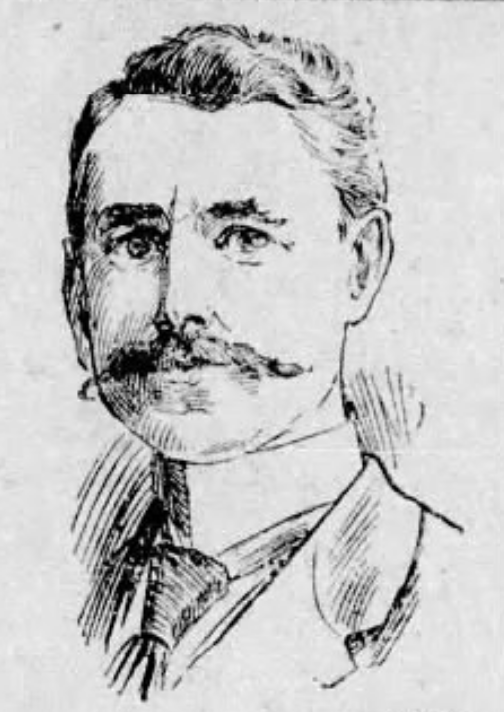
John Ryan sketch portrait in the Brandtford Expositor.

John Ryan died from heart failure on 21 March 1902 at his residence on Jarvis Street; with his remains being moved on 24 March 1902 by cortege to Union Station, then by private train to Brockville, Ontario, for internment. Ryan's requiem mass was conducted by Catholic Archbishop Charles-Hugues Gauthier at the Our Lady of Lourdes Church and was attended by the Irish Bishop of Lancaster, Thomas Flynn.

The pallbearers included: Lieutenant Governor of Ontario, Sir John Morison Gibson; Canadian Senator, George Taylor Fulford; Ontario Member of Parliament, James Joseph Foy; M.L.A., William Henry Comstock; M.J. Hanley, Lieutenant-Colonel Edward George Mason; Canadian Senator, G.P. Graham; and the Honourable Samuel Casey Wood. Ryan was then interred at the Old St. Francis Xavier Cemetery outside of Brockville.

Ryan left an estate which included liquid assets valued at over half a million dollars. Three weeks after Ryan's death the executors of the estate announced in the Toronto Star that the fortune would revert to his widow and children; with special allotments made for Raymond Ryan who was still finishing his studies in England.
