= Hugh Ryan (railway magnate) =

Irish-Canadian railway magnate, industrialist, banker and philanthropist

The Honourable Hugh Ryan
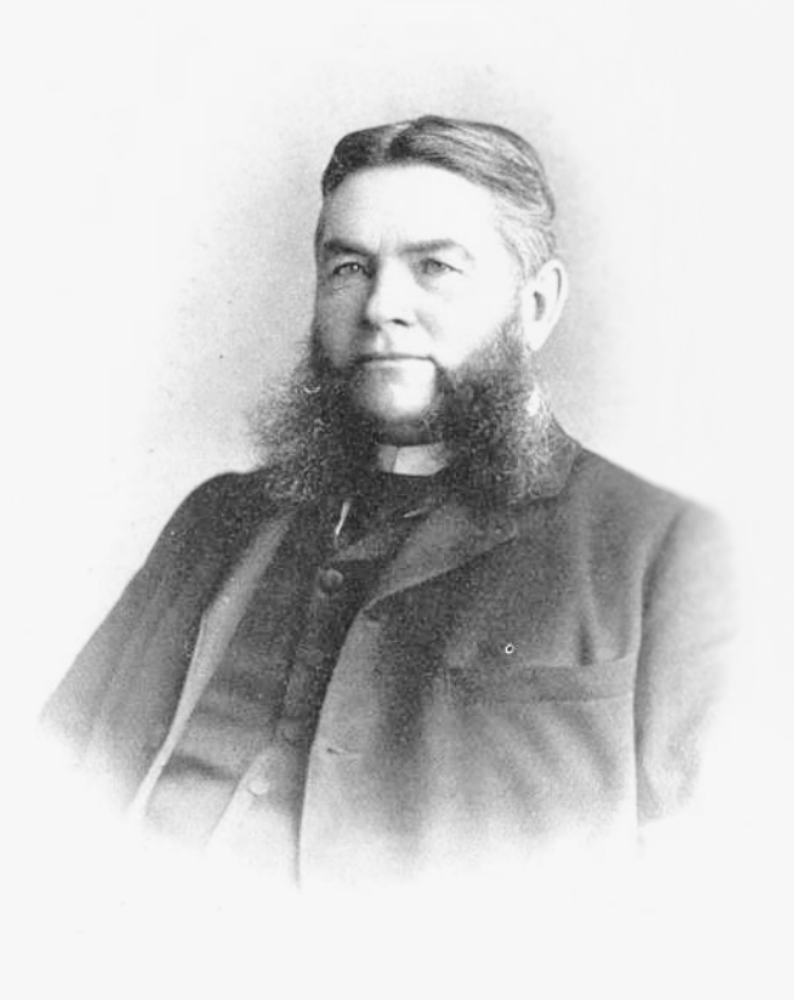
- Portrait commissioned in 1898
- Born: July 1832; Doon, County Limerick, Ireland
- Died: 13 February 1899 (aged 66); Toronto, Ontario, Canada
- Burial place: Mount Hope Catholic Cemetery
- Citizenship: Canadian
- Occupations: Railway magnate Industrialist
- Organizations: H. & J. Ryan; Imperial Bank of Canada
- Spouse: Mary Margaret Ryan (née Walsh)
- Children: John Thomas Ryan (son); Patrick William Ryan (son); Alphonso Martin Ryan (son); Mary Alice Ryan (daughter); Marguerite Teresa Ryan (daughter)
- Parents: Martin John Ryan (father); Margaret Conway (mother)
- Family: John Ryan (brother); Alice Ryan (sister); Michael Doheny Jr. (brother-in-law); Margaret Isabel McHenry (niece, goddaughter); Helen Margaret Ryan (niece, goddaughter)

Signature
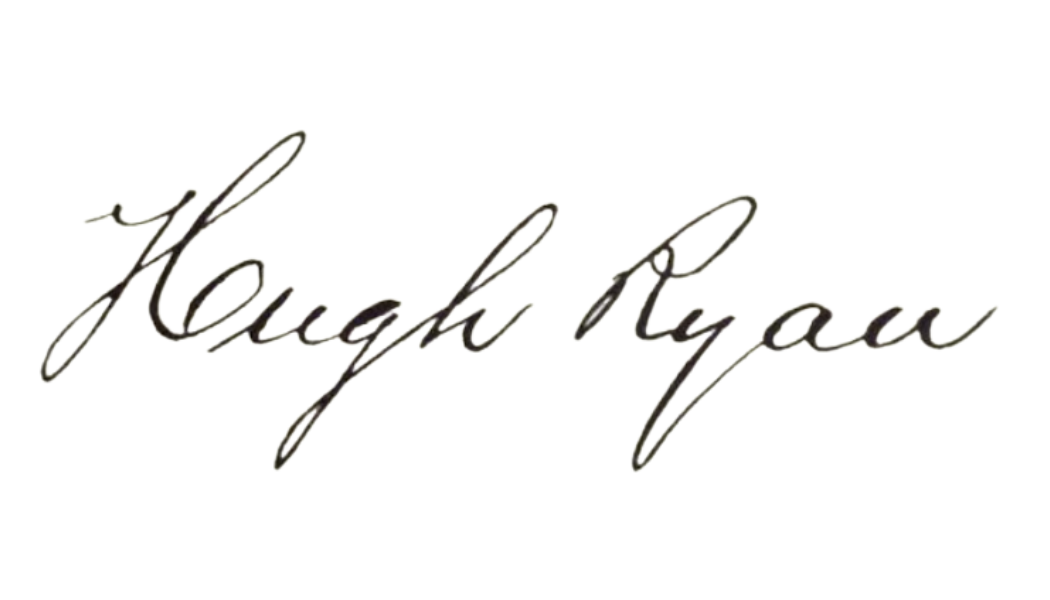

The Honourable Hugh Ryan (July 1832 – 13 February 1899) was an Irish-Canadian railway magnate, industrialist, banker, philanthropist, brother of developer John Ryan and socialite Alice Ryan, and the eldest son of Martin John Ryan and Margaret Conway. His family immigrated to Montreal, Canada, from Limerick, Ireland, in 1841 after selling Gortkelly Castle to another branch of the Ryan clan. He was dubbed "Canada's wealthiest and greatest railroad contractor" and owned the Gothic Revival residence Hollydene, identified as one of Rosedale's twenty-two original estates.

== Early career ==
In 1850, at the age of eighteen, Ryan began working on the St. Lawrence and Atlantic Railway under the direction of Polish-Canadian engineer and contractor Sir Casimir Stanislaus Gzowski; known as the "father of the Canadian Railway."

== Founding of H. & J. Ryan ==
After moving to Perth, Ontario in the 1850s, Hugh Ryan established the firm of H. & J. Ryan with his younger brother John Ryan and won the bid to build two sections of the Brockville and Ottawa Railway. In the early 1860s, the firm expanded to the United States and undertook several lucrative contracts on railways in Michigan, Maine, Kentucky, and Illinois; including the Chicago and Alton Railway.

The expansion of H. & J. Ryan from Canada into the United States allowed the firm to monopolise contracts due to the shortage of domestic railway contractors caused by the American Civil War.

On 31 October 1877, H. & J. Ryan was retained to perform an extensive quality and safety assessment of Prince Arthur's Landing and the Kaministiquia Railway by the Commissioner of Public Works of Ontario, with Hugh Ryan penning the final report.

In 1880, Sir Charles Tupper and the Liberal government awarded H. & J. Ryan several contracts for new railway track (including 100 miles northwest of Winnipeg) and bridge development in Manitoba; most notably a bridge across the Red River to connected the west and east portions of the Pembina St. Boniface line. The Red River pile bridge was completed on 28 July 1880 and formally opened by driving the state-of-the-art locomotive the "Countess of Dufferin" with Ryan, his wife Margaret, and C.P.R Superintendent T. J. Linskey amongst the VIPs.

One of the firm's largest development contracts came in 1887 for the Red River Valley Railway, later the Northern Pacific (or St Paul Minneapolis) and Manitoba Railway, awarded by John Norquay. The tender was the single largest ever secured by the firm at $750,000, requiring 6,000 tons of steel rails; and including the building of several bridges. During construction, Ryan brought legal proceedings against the government of Manitoba for delinquent payments —Ryan's lawsuit would be successful and would award him $50,000.

== Development partnerships ==
The following list is in chronological order:

=== Brooks, Foster, Ryan & Co. ===
In 1865 Ryan joined James Foster and Brockville contractor Alphonse Brooks as subcontractors on the Pictou branch of the Nova Scotia Railway. Ryan would partner with Brooks shortly after, this time building a sizeable portion of the western extension of the European and North American Railway, in New Brunswick and Maine.

=== Brown, Brooks & Ryan. ===
Between 1870 – 1875 Ryan, Alphonse Brooks and New Brunswick contractor James Brown, established Brown, Brooks & Ryan to build the most costly sections of the Intercolonial Railway: the two bridges over the Miramichi River and six miles of approaches. The firm worked under the direct supervision of chief engineer Sir Sandford Fleming.

=== Purcell & Ryan. ===
In 1876 Ryan partnered with Scottish-Canadian politician Patrick Purcell to establish the industrialisation firm Purcell and Ryan; responsible for developing 112 miles of the Canadian Pacific Railway (CPR) west of Thunder Bay, Ontario.

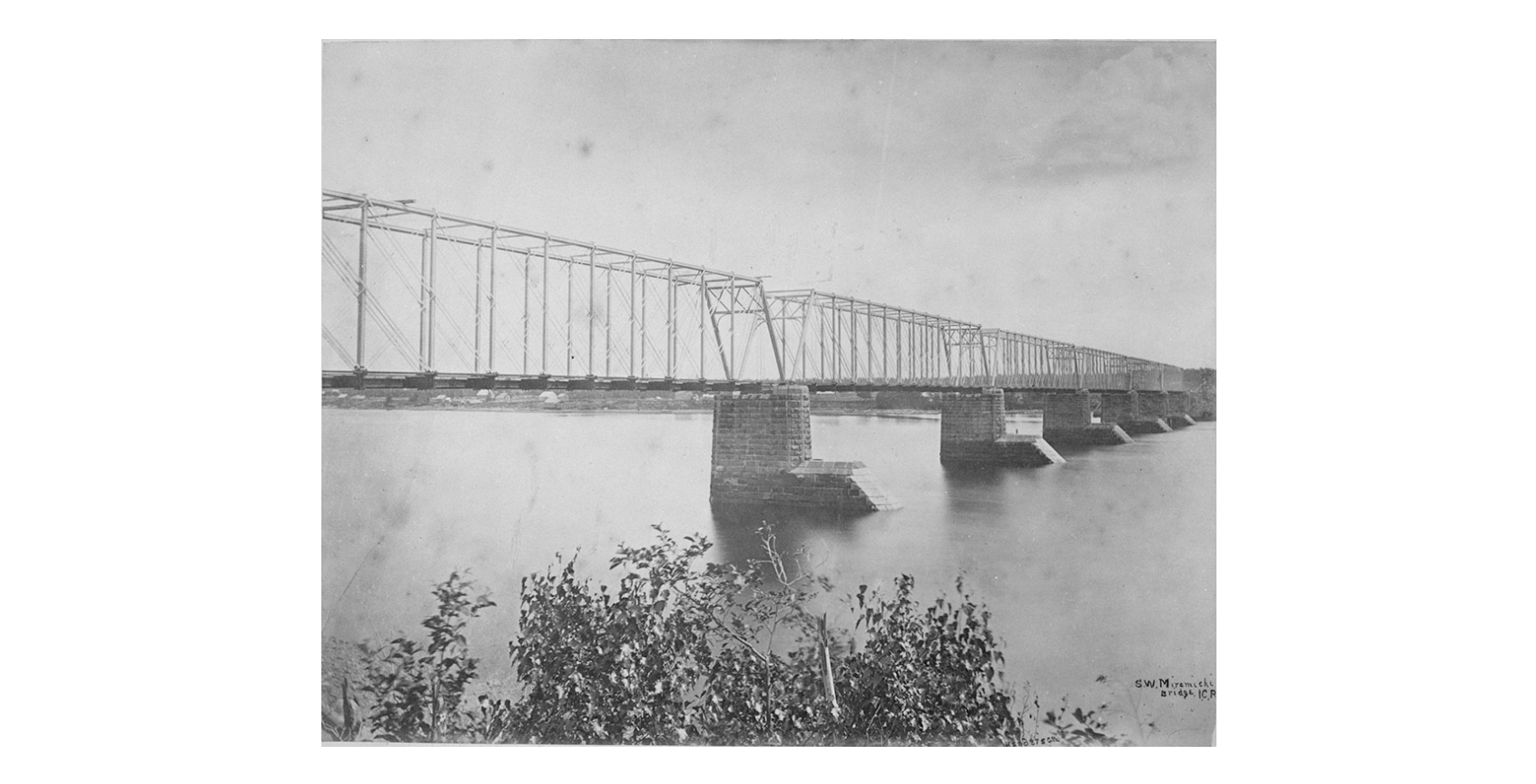
Photographed in 1875, the Southwest Miramichi Bridge on the Intercolonial Railway, built by industrialist Hugh Ryan and his firm Brown, Brooks & Ryan.

=== Purcell & Co. ===
In 1879 Ryan and Purcell joined their competitors, John Ginty and Thomas Mark, to establish Purcell & Company; responsible for developing a treacherous 118 miles of the CPR (connected to the 112 miles developed by Purcell & Ryan). The firm completed the railway in 1883, receiving bipartisan support for the principals from Prime Minister John A Macdonald, as well as the Conservative (Tory) and Liberal governments of the time (provincial and federal).

=== Hugh Ryan & Co. ===
In 1888 Ryan, his brother John Ryan, and Michael John Haney established Hugh Ryan & Co.; and secured the contract from the Conservative government to build the Sault Ste. Marie Canal, Ontario. The specifications for the canal were changed twice during construction —Ryan was responsible for one of these occasions— thus necessitating renegotiation of the contract price with the Deputy Minister of Railways and Canals, Toussaint Trudeau (ancestor of Prime Ministers Pierre Trudeau and Justin Trudeau). The final contract price was a win for Ryan at $1.2 million.

While Mr. Ryan could justly feel gratified at his wonderful success as a railway contractor, his supreme effort was on the construction of the Canadian Sault Canal, requiring six years of time. The structure will itself prove a monument to his business ability and mechanical genius.

== Role as Superintendent of Construction ==
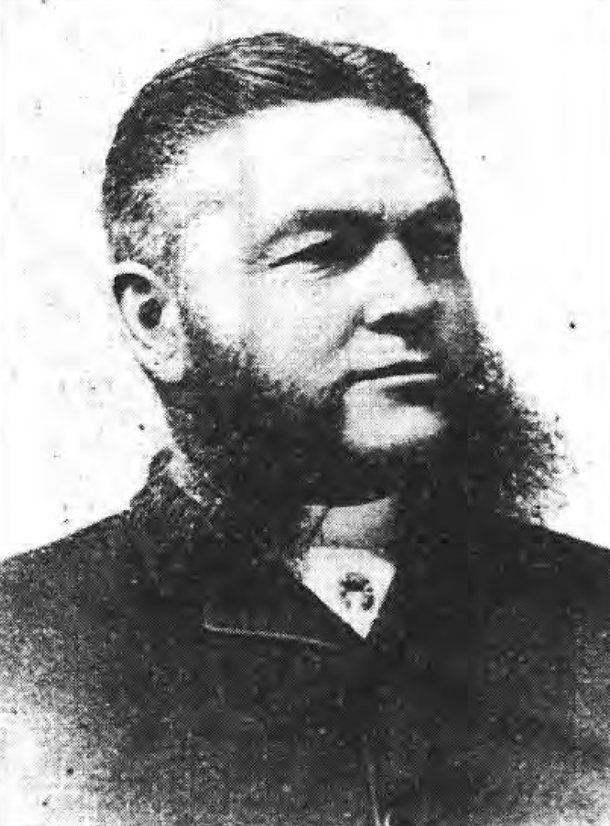
Industrialist Hugh Ryan, responsible for constructing large portions of the Brockville, Ottawa, Kaministiquia, Manitoba Railways, the Intercolonial Railway, and the Canadian Pacific Railway (CPR).

Between 1883 and 1884, Ryan served as the Superintendent of Construction for the Toronto–Ottawa line of the Ontario and Quebec Railway Company, which was leased by the CPR. In his official capacity, Ryan drove the last spike of the Ontario & Quebec Railway approximately 8 kilometers (5 miles) east of Agincourt on 5 May 1884.

== Business ventures ==
During the 1880s and 90s, Ryan aggressively expanded his business portfolio beyond development contracting by founding the Dominion Cable Company and becoming a director of various concerns, among them: the Imperial Bank of Canada, the Freehold Loan and Savings Company, the Toronto General Trusts Company, the Toronto Electric Light Company, the Canadian General Electric Company; the Dominion Cattle Company; and the Canadian Locomotive and Engine Company in Kingston, Ontario.

=== Dominion Cattle Company ===
The Dominion Cattle Company was established in 1882 for the purposes of breeding, raising, buying and selling cattle, horses and sheep on 500,000 acres of land stretching between Oklahoma and Texas (including Day Ranch and the Box T Ranch). The founders included Hugh Ryan, rancher J.P. Wiser, the Hon. Rufus Henry Pope, the Hon. William Bullock Ives, the Hon. A.W. Ogilvie and William Herring. In 1883 the Dominion Cattle Company acquired an additional 284,113 acres of land in the Cherokee strip adjacent their Texas holdings on a five year lease. Ryan lobbied for the company to be listed on the Montreal Stock Exchange in 1884, and was subsequently elected as a director in 1885 alongside Senator Matthew Henry Cochrane. By 1887 the company owned 30,000 cattle and 400 horses valued at $933,000, and Ryan owned the second largest number of company stocks with a value of $130,000; which he sold before the company filed for bankruptcy 1888.

== Philanthropy at St Michael's Hospital ==
A Roman Catholic, Ryan was approached by Archbishop John Walsh in 1893 to fund a major extension of St Michael's Hospital; where Ryan served as vice-president of the board. Ryan agreed, building a three-storey surgical wing that included an operating theatre designed to accommodate fifty medical students and ten wards each containing ten beds. The wards had an advanced feature for the time: hot-and-cold-air registers so that the temperature of each ward could be customised to fit the needs of patients. As a result, the hospital became the second largest of the city's twenty-eight hospitals, after Toronto General where Ryan also served as a board member.

The Hugh Ryan wing —the building a gift of Mr. Ryan, the furnishings a gift of his wife, Margaret— was opened on Thanksgiving Day, 1895. The only condition Ryan made part of the deed was that the hospital be kept open night and day to receive anyone in need of its services, without consideration for creed, colour or nationality. The public wards faced Bond Street and boasted an adjoining convalescent room on each of the three floors, filled with easy chairs, a bookcase, and writing table. But it was for the private and semi-private rooms that Mrs. Ryan must have really given her imagination (and her pocket book) free rein —brass bedsteads, oak bedroom sets, engravings on the walls, a service of china and silver, and soft rugs on the hardwood floors.

The Hugh Ryan Wing was opened by Archbishop John Walsh on Canadian Thanksgiving, 1895, with speakers including Ryan himself, M.P. Oliver Aiken Howland, M.P. George Ralph Richardson Cockburn, and the extension's chief architect John A. Pearson. An enthusiastic press wrote that the new addition was a model for sanitation, lighting and ventilation. The wing ultimately cost Ryan $40,000.

That same year Ryan also built the nurses' residence, named the "Margaret Ryan Home for Nurses" after his wife, who oversaw the furnishing of said residences; like she had with the public, private and semi-private hospital rooms. The residence consisted of three houses and was connected to the hospital by a covered passage —one house was occupied by the Sisters of Saint Joseph and the other two by nurses in training, at that time numbering between thirty and forty.

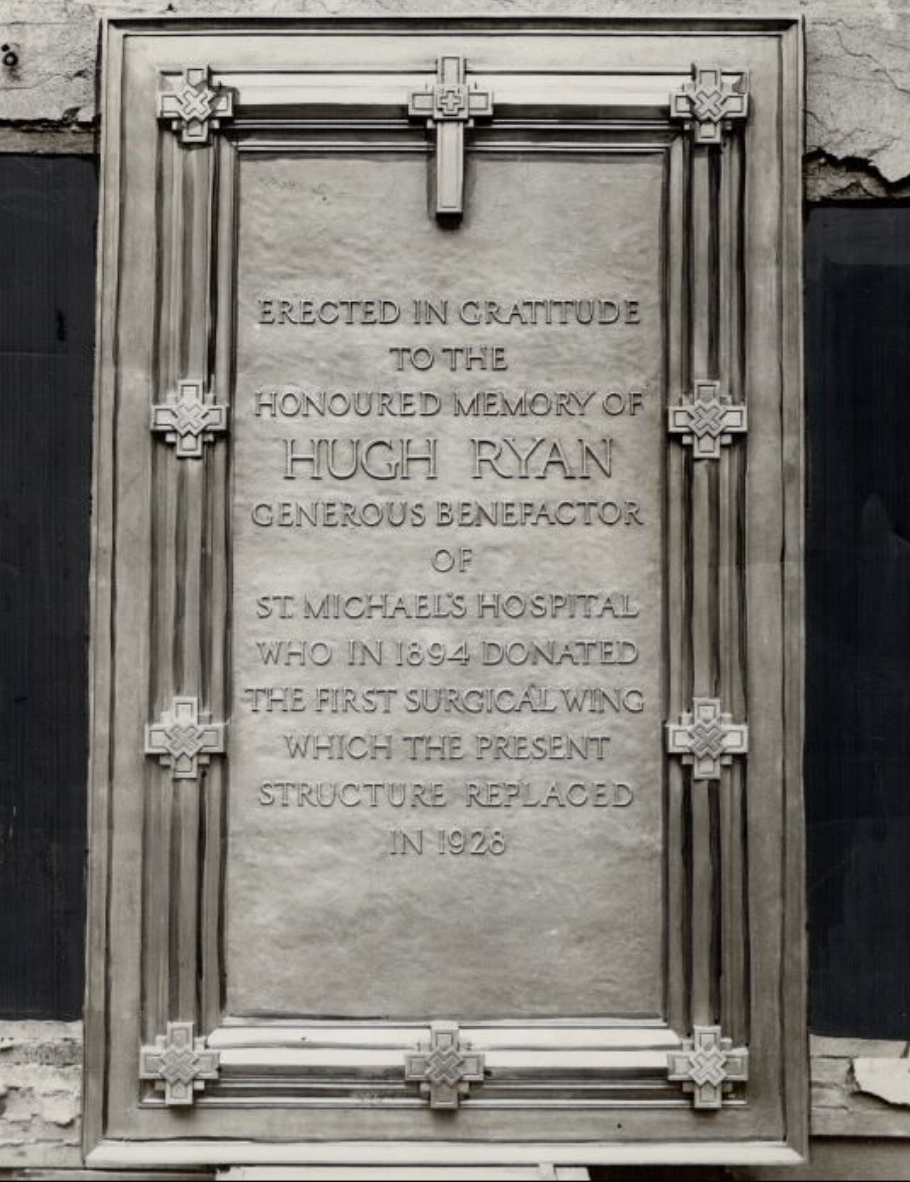
Inscription Reads: Erected in gratitude to the honoured memory of Hugh Ryan, generous benefactor of St Michael's Hospital who in 1894 donated the first surgical wing which the present structure replaced in 1928.

== Catholic Endowments & Artwork ==
For his philanthropic efforts, Hugh Ryan was nicknamed the "model millionaire" in Ontario's Catholic circles —of which he was an active and prominent member.

Hugh Ryan gave freely of his business advice to the Catholic Church and was always a generous supporter of charities, with Catholic organisations receiving the greatest share.

Ryan bequeathed endowments from his estate totalling $28,000 to Catholic and other Toronto charities including: St Michael's Hospital, House of Providence, Sunnyside Orphanage, the Society of St Vincent de Paul, Toronto General Hospital, Toronto House of Industry, Toronto Rehabilitation Institute, the Hospital for Sick Children, and Convent of the Precious Blood

In 1887, while in Rome, Italy, Ryan and his wife Mary ordered a cycle of fourteen devotional paintings, a series of Stations of the Cross, for St. John the Baptist Roman Catholic Church in Perth, Ontario, where they had married in 1858. The paintings, collectively valued at $1,000 were shipped directly to Perth, Ontario.

== Relationship with Ireland ==
Ryan's documented interest in the political happenings of his native Ireland was punctuated by his sizeable donations to the Irish Parliamentary Party; in an effort to help Irish nationalist Members of Parliament and further their agenda of Irish Independence in the House of Commons at Westminster.

In 1895, Ryan was approached once again by Archbishop John Walsh of Toronto, and the Premier of Ontario, Edward Blake, to support the idea of an Irish Race Convention in Dublin the following year. Though Ryan initially declined the offer, he did ultimately attend the 1896 convention as part of the official Canadian delegation representing the city of Toronto, as reported by the Globe and Mail, alongside John Costigan, Sir William Mulock, James Joseph Foy, and Sir Frank Smith (his daughter Marys's father-in-law).

== Background, Marriage & Family ==
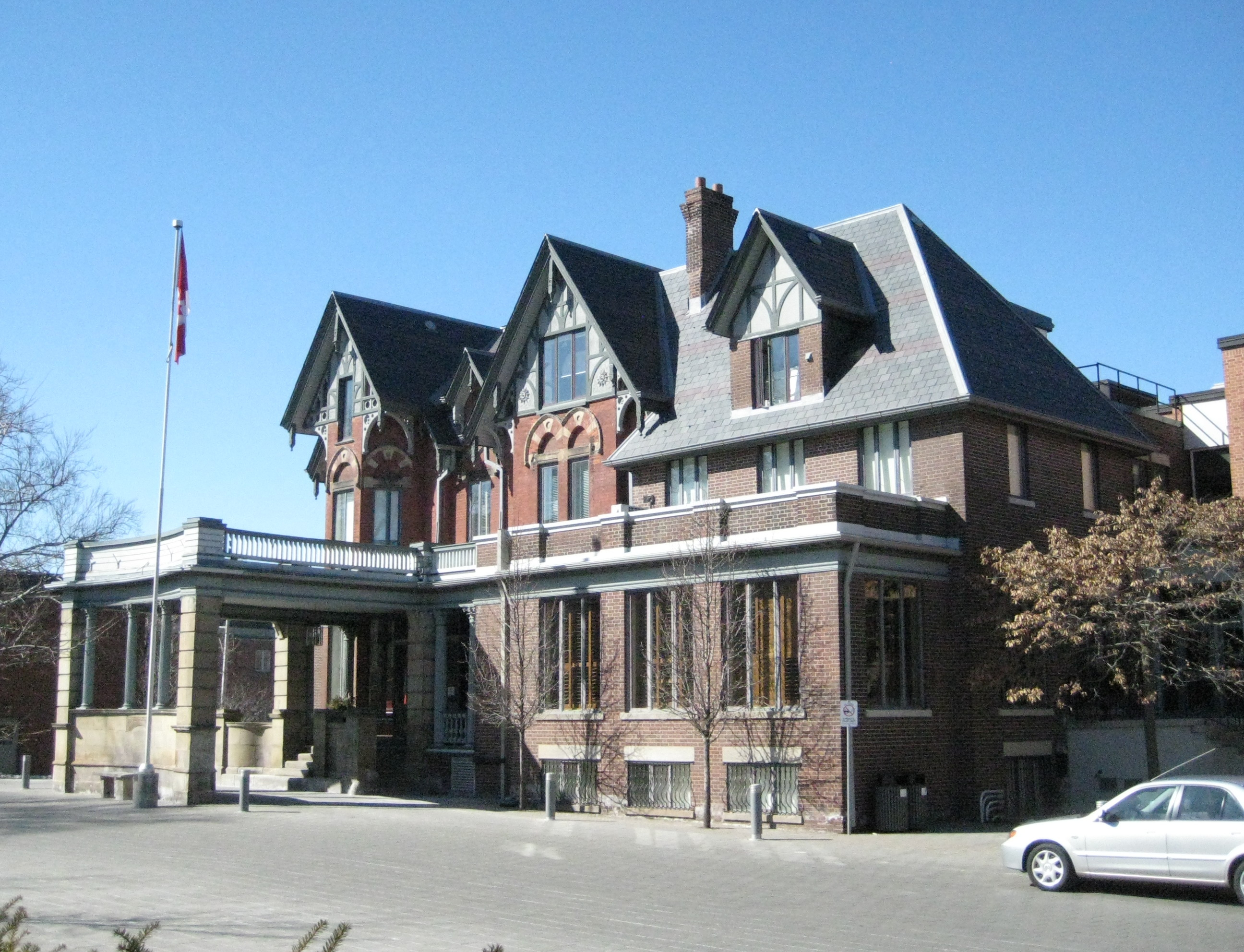
Hollydene, now Branksome Hall, was the Ryan family home after Hugh Ryan purchased it 1886.

=== Background & Siblings ===
Hugh Ryan, the eldest son of Martin John Ryan and Margaret Conway, was born into a wealthy Irish-Catholic family, who owned Gortkelly Castle before his father sold the estate. The family immigrated in 1841 to Montreal, Canada, when Ryan was nine years old. Ryan had three younger siblings: John Ryan, Patrick Ryan, and Catherine Ryan; and one older sibling in Alice Ryan.

=== Marriage, Children & GodChildren ===
On 20 March 1858 Ryan married Mary Margaret Walsh in Perth, Ontario. The couple lived in Hollydene a Gothic Revival mansion in the Rosedale neighbourhood of Toronto, with their five children: Mary "Minnie" Alice Ryan, John Thomas Ryan, Patrick William Ryan, Alphonso Martin Ryan, and Marguerite "Rita" Teresa Ryan. Hollydene, now Branksome Hall, is classified as a building of historical significance under Part V of the Ontario Heritage Act.

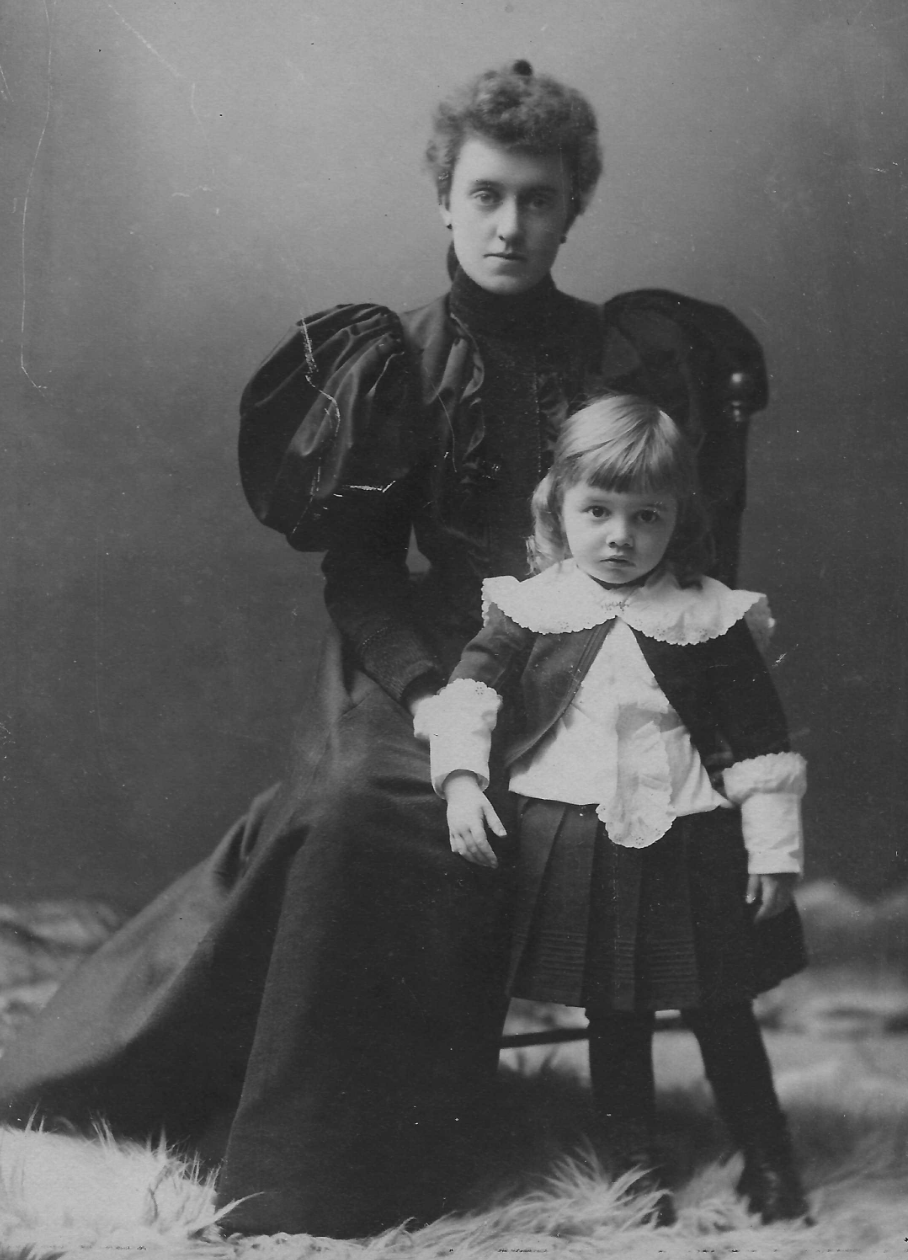
Hugh Ryan's sister, Alice Ryan, pictured alongside her daughter Margaret Isabel Doheny. Hugh Ryan was godfather to his niece and named her as one of his primary heirs.

Hugh Ryan's daughter Mary "Minnie" Alice Ryan married James Austin Smith, son of Canadian Senator and business tycoon Sir. Frank Smith, on 5 June 1888 at Our Lady of Lourdes Church in a "fashionable ceremony" conducted by Bishop Timothy O'Mahony. The bridesmaids included the bride's sister Miss Rita Ryan, the bride's cousins Miss Nellie Ryan and Miss Margaret Isabel McHenry, and socialite Miss Kathleen Harty (daughter of Ontario politician William Harty).

Ryan's wife Margaret died on 23 February 1904 while vacationing in Cairo, Egypt with their daughters, and was interred in the family mausoleum at the Mount Hope Catholic Cemetery, Toronto.

Hugh Ryan was godfather to Alice Ryan's daughter Margaret Isabel McHenry (née Doheny) and John Ryan's daughters Isabelle Teresa Pettit (née Ryan) and Helen Margaret "Nellie" MacDonell (née Ryan). Helen's youngest son, Hugh MacDonell, was named after her uncle. All three goddaughters received sizeable sums in Ryan's last will and testament.

== Death ==
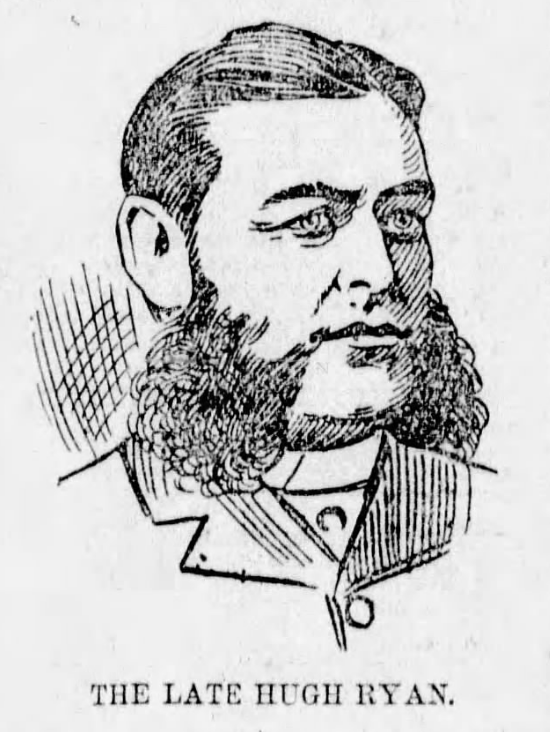
Hugh Ryan's obituary sketch featured in The Montreal Star on 13 February 1899.

In October 1898 Hugh Ryan contracted Bright's disease and died four months later on 13 February 1899 as "one of the richest men in Toronto" with his estate valued at $1.4 million. Ryan's estate held property assets in Ontario, Quebec, Manitoba, The Northwest Territories and New York City.

The majority of Ryan's estate was bequeathed to his wife, two daughters, and three goddaughters. Ryan's youngest sister, socialite Alice Ryan, with whom he was reportedly close, also received a generous sum along with all of Ryan's landholdings in Winnipeg, Manitoba.

Prime Minister Sir Wilfrid Laurier sent a telegram of condolences to the Ryan family the morning of his passing. Speaking of his death, the leading Toronto paper said: "In the death of Mr. Ryan, Canada has lost one of her strongest characters and keenest intellects, and Toronto one of her most benevolent citizens."

The funeral was held two days later on 15 February 1899 at St. Michael's Cathedral Basilica, Toronto, with the requiem mass celebrated by Archbishop John Walsh. Attendees included Ontario politician, William Harty; Liberal Party cabinet member E.J. Davis; Speaker of the Legislature Alfred Évanturel; and Kingston Mayor Dr. Edward Ryan.

Ryan's pall-bearers included: the 32nd governor of Massachusetts, John Davis Long; the eighth lieutenant governor of Ontario, Sir Oliver Mowat; Member of Parliament, Sir Edmund Boyd Osler; Conservative Senator, James Mason; Ontario politician, William Harty; Ontario Banker, W.S. Lee; and famed Canadian brewer Eugene O'Keefe.

Hugh Ryan was one of the best-known men in Canada, and he left an imperishable monument of behind him in the hundreds of miles of railway he constructed, opening up a new empire to the world. At the time of his death, he was one of the oldest railway contractors on the American continent, having spent forty-six years in the occupation. In all of his enterprises, involving the expenditure of millions of dollars, he never entered an action at law against any man —a fact which alone speaks volumes for his business tact.

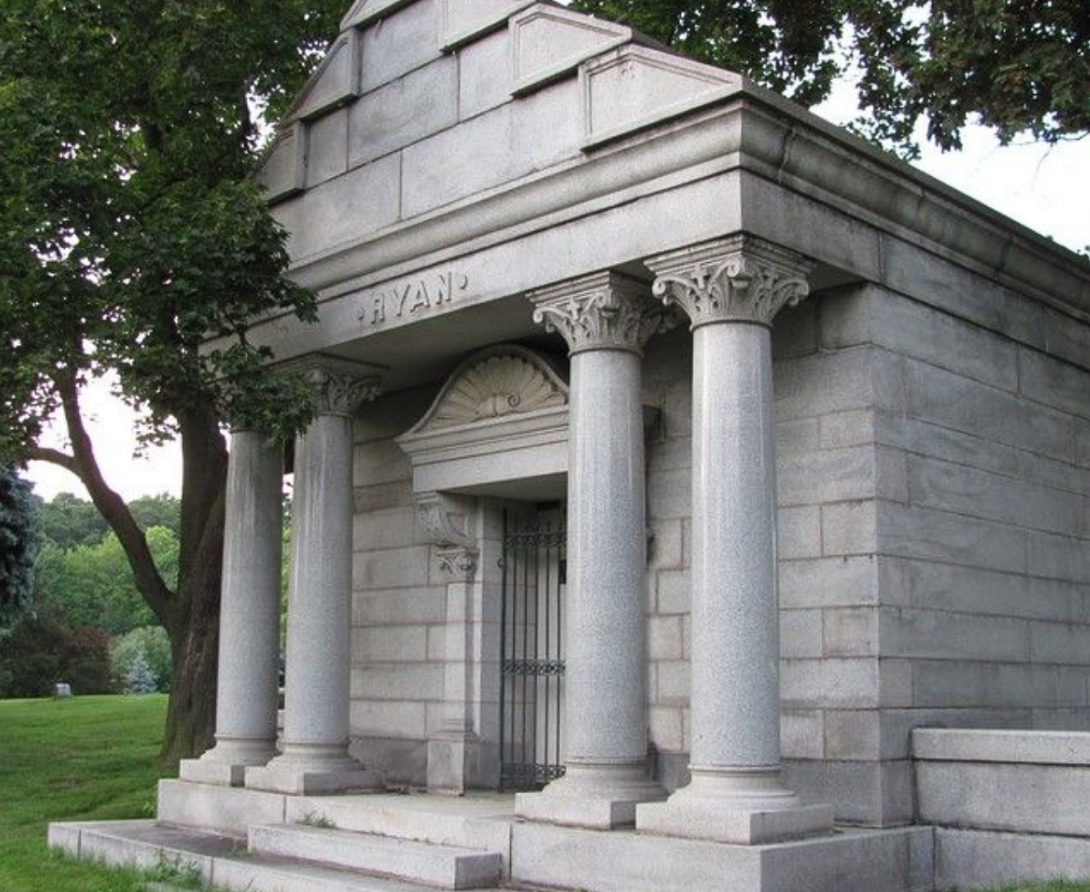
The Ryan family mausoleum in Mount Hope Catholic Cemetery, Ontario built by Hugh Ryan.
