= Catholic Women's League of Canada =

The League's emblem

The Catholic Women's League of Canada is a national service organization of women who are members of the Roman Catholic Church, and who work together to promote Catholic values and to carry out volunteer and charitable work. In 2016 the CWLA has about 83,000 members in over 1,200 parish councils across Canada. The League's national office is in Winnipeg, Manitoba; it is federally incorporated, and is a registered not-for-profit membership association. The League does not have registered charitable status.

Membership is predominantly Catholic women aged 16 and older, but associate membership exists for non-Catholics. There is a parish-based Catholic Girls' League for members 10 to 15 years of age.

== History ==
=== Founding ===
The Catholic Women's League was founded in England in 1906 by Miss Margaret Fletcher. The Canadian organization was founded in 1920 after Katherine Hughes of Edmonton brought news of the British organization to Bishop Emile Legal in Canada. Legal called upon Hughes and Abbé Casgrain to set up an organization to help immigrant women and girls who were seeking work in Edmonton. The organization's first meeting was in November 1912, and as a result a job placement service was set up and Rosary Hall was opened, to provide safe and affordable accommodation.

During the next few years, a number of separate women's groups were established, based on The Catholic Women's League in England: Montreal in 1917, Toronto in 1918 and Halifax in 1919.

=== Early years and first national executive ===
A study group in Montreal known as the Loyola Club became a Catholic Women's Club in 1917, organized by Margaret Jones, with first president Bellelle Guerin. This club became the Montreal City Subdivision in 1920, and claimed the founding subdivision.

At this time all nationally organized women's groups were called to Ottawa to share their opinions with the minister of Reconstruction & Immigration concerning the settling of thousands of immigrants arriving in Canada from war-ravaged Europe. Members of the Montreal Catholic Women's Club, noting that there was no national group of Catholic women, set out to organize one. In March, 1920, invitations were sent to the various Catholic women's groups in Canada, including Hamilton, St. Catharines and Saint John, offering to host a meeting in Montreal for this purpose.

The conference was held on June 17, 1920, with delegates from Edmonton, Regina, Toronto, Hamilton, Ottawa, Sherbrooke, Saint John and Halifax.

Bellelle Guerin, president of the Montreal CWL, was asked to be chairman of the conference. An executive was elected, organizational details ironed out, and future activities were discussed. The new League's first act was to send a petition to the federal government asking or stricter divorce laws in Canada.

In 1921 the League chose a motto, For God and Canada. At the annual national convention in 1923 in Halifax, a resolution was passed to adopt Our Lady of Good Counsel as the League's patroness. In December of that year the CWLC was granted federal incorporation.

During World War II, the League raised $25,000 for the war effort and sent more than 7 million cigarettes to the soldiers overseas.

In 1947 the constitution of the CWLC was altered to ensure more clerical supervision of the League's activities, and to set up councils at parish, diocesan and provincial levels.

As of 2015, the Catholic Women's League of Canada had 83,990 members.

== Organization ==
=== Councils ===
As well as the national council, there are 11 provincial councils — one of each of the 10 provinces, which includes territories, and a military ordinariate, which was granted provincial status in 1965— 38 diocesan councils and 1,223 parish councils.

Each council administers the affairs at its own level, and sends a representative to the council at the next level. The national council represents the members nationally and internationally.

=== Standing Committees ===
As well as the usual organizational committees, the League had several standing committees related to Catholic values and community service, including Spiritual Development, Christian Family Life, Community Life, and Education and Health. There is also a Communications committee which facilitates The Canadian League magazine and other publications.

In 2021, members voted on amendments to the League’s Constitution & Bylaws which reduced the standing committees to three, Faith, Service and Social Justice, representing the League’s core values.

== League Work ==
The League supports women's programs in developing countries through MaterCare International, the Coady International Institute and the Canadian Catholic Organization for Development and Peace, and has raised millions of dollars for local, national and international charities. The League is well known for its parish bake sales which raise funds for charities and parish and community initiatives.

Members of the national executive meet annually with federal government ministers on issues raised by resolutions, which come from the parish level, and have included such issues as religious freedom, renewable energy, farmers' rights, abolition of the death penalty, suicide prevention, child poverty, protection of human life and building partnerships and relationships with Canada's indigenous peoples.

== See also ==
- Catholic Women's League

=== Archives ===
There is a Catholic Women's League of Canada fonds at Library and Archives Canada. The archival reference number is R3285, former archival reference number MG28-I345. The fonds covers the date range 1900 to 2010. It consists of: 3.3 meters of textual records; 232 photographs, and a number of other media records.
