= Our Lady of Lourdes Church (Toronto) =

Coordinates: 43.668492°N 79.375464°W

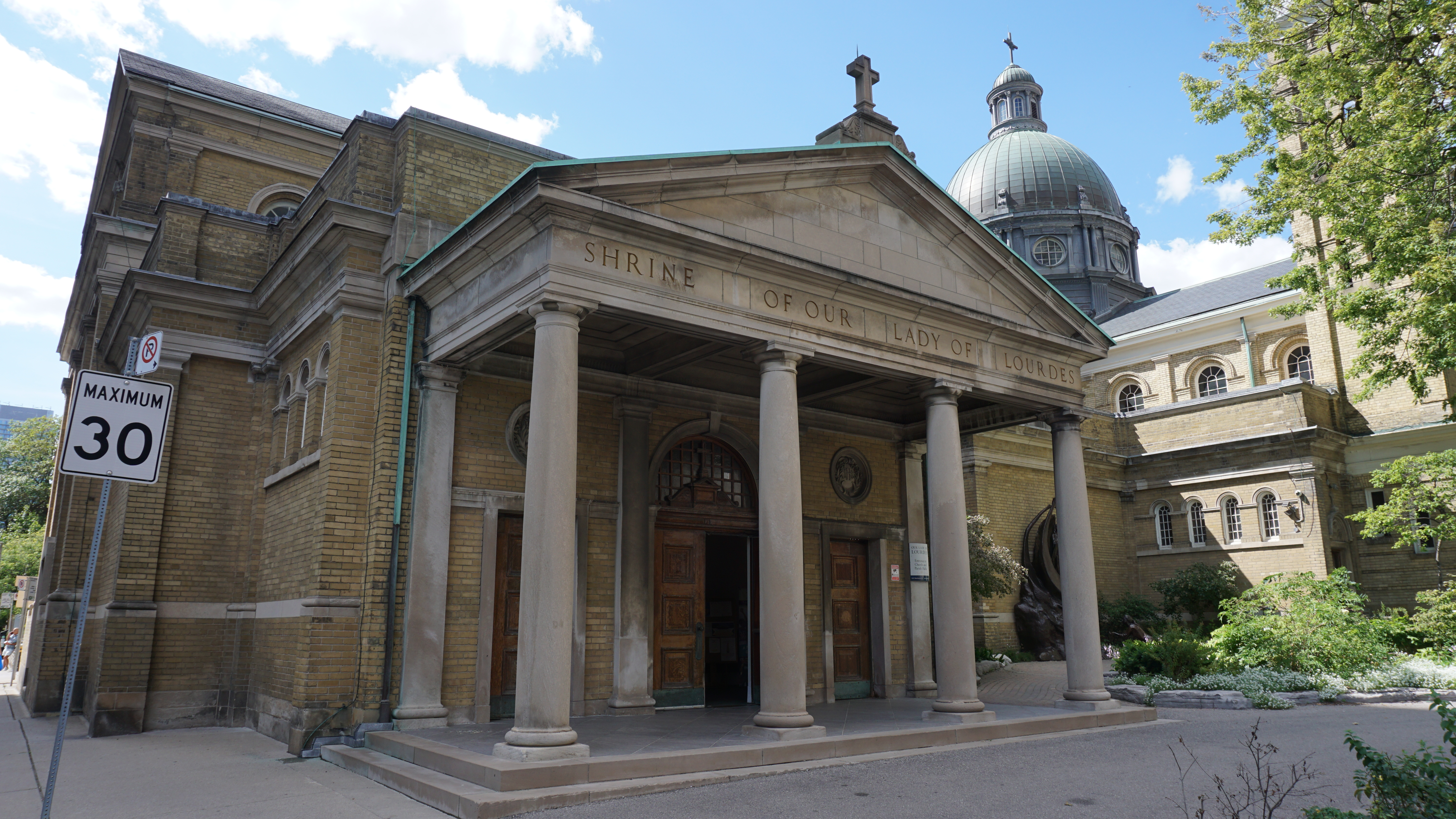

- Location in Toronto
- Location: 520 Sherbourne Street; Toronto, Ontario; M4X 1K2
- Country: Canada
- Denomination: Roman Catholic and Jesuit
- Website: Lourdes.to

History
- Status: Active
- Founded: 1879
- Dedication: Our Lady of Lourdes
- Dedicated: 28 October 1886

Architecture
- Functional status: Parish church
- Architect: Frederick Charles Law
- Style: Romanesque Revival
- Completed: 1886

Administration
- Province: Toronto
- Diocese: Toronto
- Deanery: Downtown

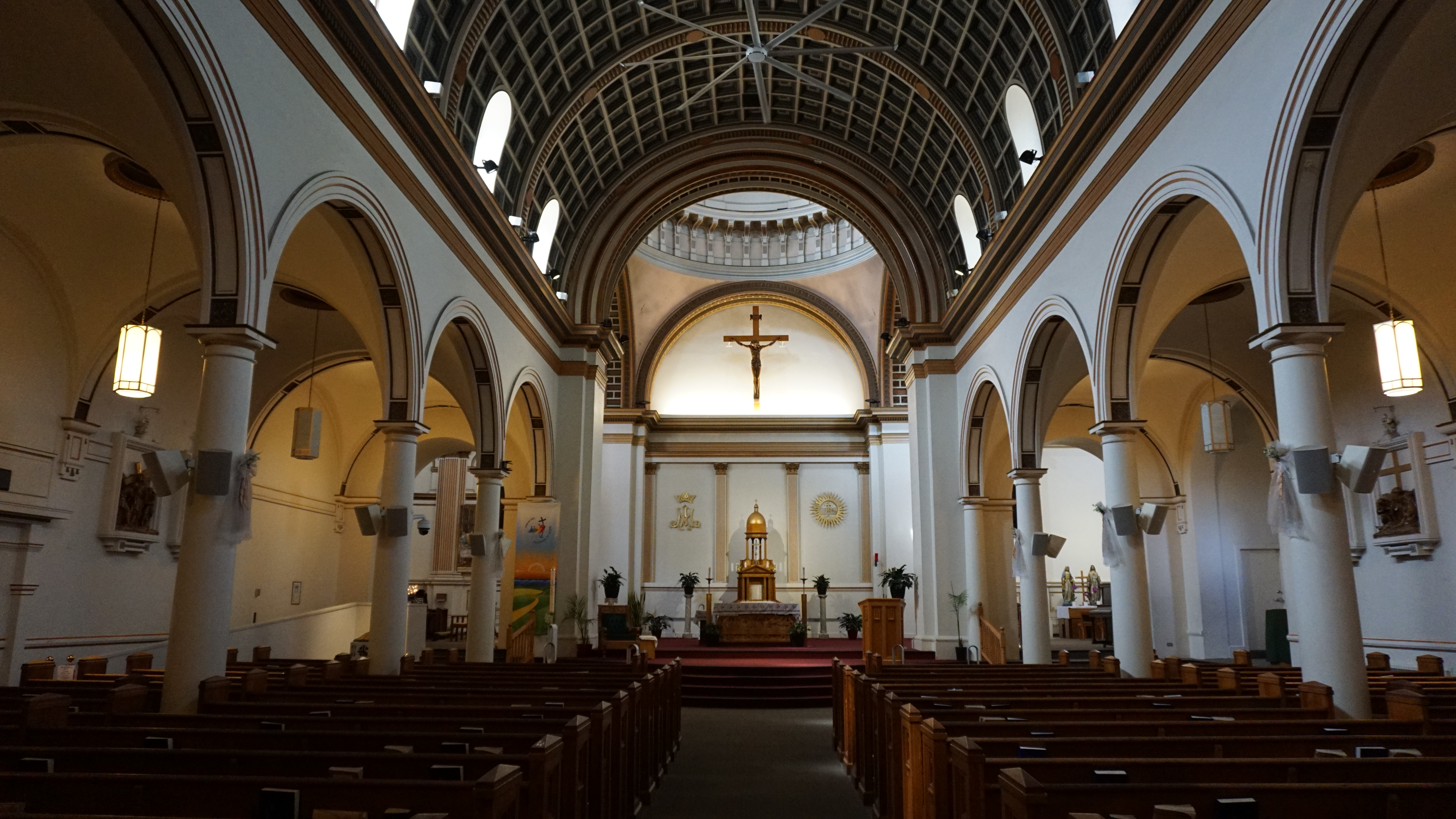
Interior

Our Lady of Lourdes is a Roman Catholic parish church in Toronto, Ontario, Canada. It was founded in 1879 and served by the Society of Saint Vincent de Paul. Since 1969 it has been administered by the Society of Jesus on behalf of the Archdiocese of Toronto. It is located at 520 Sherbourne Street in Downtown Toronto. It was designed by Frederick Charles Law who modelled the church on the Basilica of Santa Maria del Popolo. In 1986, it was given a centennial plaque by Heritage Toronto.

== History ==
=== Foundation ===
The church was founded in 1879. During that time the area was known as St. John’s Grove and was the site of the Archbishop of Toronto’s summer residence. In 1885, on the 25th anniversary of the episcopal ordination of John Joseph Lynch, the Archbishop of Toronto, the clergy of the archdiocese created a church next to the summer residence as a gift to the archbishop.

=== Construction ===
The church was designed by Frederick Charles Law and he built it in the Romanesque Revival architectural style. He drew inspiration for the church's design on the Basilica of Santa Maria del Popolo in Rome. Part of the summer residence of the archbishop still exists as it forms part of the church's parish hall. On 28 October 1886 the church was opened.

In 1910, alterations were made to the church. The nave was added and the church of the summer residence became the sanctuary of Our Lady of Lourdes' Church.

=== Development ===
Over time the area changed dramatically and became a united, diversified, and a multicultural community in the Toronto Centre District. The biggest change was the creation of the St. James Town Community Projects. The church was originally affiliated with the Society of Saint Vincent de Paul, but, in part because these changes, the church was handed over to the Jesuits in 1969.

== Parish ==
St. James Town is mostly populated by immigrants, foreign workers, international students, and tourists from different countries with various traditions and cultures and these groups form the majority of the parishioners who are from all walks of life. The church also hosts “All Inclusive Ministry” on the fourth Saturday of the month, a Catholic community for lesbians, gays, bisexuals, nonbinary, and transgender people. The parish ministry and hospitality welcome everyone regardless of race, nationality, creed, gender, age, sexual orientation, social-economic status, and others, as per the Human Rights Code of Canada. In this way, the church community strive to live out their Christian commitment and values in building the City of God for world peace, love, humility, compassion, social justice, hope, unity, and faith in God.

The church has seven Sunday Masses at 5:15pm on Saturday and at 8:30am, 10:00am, 11:30am, 1:00pm, 5:00pm (in Tamil) and at 7:00pm on Sunday.

== See also ==
- Jesuits in Canada
- List of Jesuit sites
- List of Roman Catholic churches in Toronto
