= Margaret Fletcher =

British founder Catholic Women's League

- Born: 1862; Oxford, England
- Died: 1943 (aged 80–81)
- Known for: Catholic Women's League

Margaret Fletcher (1862–1943) was an author, artist and a pioneer in the field of women's education, promoter of Christian feminism and founder of the Catholic Women's League.

== Early years ==
Margaret Fletcher was born in Oxford, England, one of nine children of an Anglican clergyman, Rev. Carteret J.H. Fletcher. She attended Oxford High School and later studied art in Oxford under John Ruskin, at Slade School of Art and at the Female School of Art in Bloomsbury. Frustrated at what she saw as a lack of opportunity for women artists in England, women, for example, being barred from life classes, aged only 20, when it was still unconventional for young women to travel unchaperoned, she went to Colorassi Studio in Paris, where both sexes were treated equally. She continued her studies there, exhibiting one of her paintings in the Salon. As an art student, she met with people from many different backgrounds, exchanging ideas on art, culture and international affairs; this exposure broadened her views, and likely would not have occurred in the security and complacence of Victorian England. Her stay in Paris was cut short by the death of her mother in 1888 but it helped to shape her future work. She returned to Oxford, abandoning a promising career as a professional artist, to look after her younger siblings and her father whom she cared for until his death in 1918, aged 91."The family", she modestly wrote, "must be my first care. Nothing can exceed the futile misery of the sacrifice of other lives made on the altar of small talents."

She continued painting and taught art at the Oxford High School for twenty years. In 1889, Fletcher went with a girl friend on a sketching tour of Hungary. She illustrated with pen and ink sketches scenes from Jane Austen, in Duologues and Scenes from the Novels of Jane Austen (1895). Her paintings include "Nancy" exhibited at the Royal Academy in 1886, Professor Thorold Rogers (1891) which hangs in Worcester College, Oxford, the actress Lady Martin Harvey (stage- name Nell de Silva) (1889) and Jesuit Fr. Dominic Plater (1920) in possession of Jesuit Archives in London. She also established a life class in Oxford despite some opposition from the City authorities. She engaged in some theatrical ventures with Nigel Playfair and Rosina Filippi in the O.U.D.S. and elsewhere with Frank Benson and the Martin-Harveys.

== Catholic Women's League ==
In 1897, Fletcher converted to Catholicism. Despite her father being an Anglican clergyman, she did not encounter opposition from her family.

In 1904, Fletcher founded a quarterly magazine, The Crucible, aimed at providing a periodical of higher education for women and arousing the interest of teachers and schools in getting better education for women. This led in 1906 to her founding, with the approval of the Catholic hierarchy, the Catholic Women's League ("CWL"). She worked tirelessly to ensure its success and to promote the emancipation of women and a more prominent role for them in education and other spheres of public life, travelling extensively both in Great Britain and on the Continent. It was the time of the Suffrage movement but Fletcher saw many dangers inherent in it. Her aim was "to put into the field trained bands of women" by promoting the education of Catholic lay women to engage in the public sphere. She was convinced that the conventional protective shelter for women was unnecessary.

Her success as an educator and enabler of Catholic lay women's participation in this sphere was well demonstrated during the First World War. CWL was able to place "trained bands of women" at the disposal of both Church and state for war work. CWL staffed canteen huts both at home and abroad for servicemen and provided accommodation for Belgian refugees and munition workers, receiving recognition for its work from the British, French and Belgian governments. Similar work was carried out during the Second World War when mobile canteens were sent to Normandy as early as August 1944 and CWL was active in every theatre of the War. Fletcher had retired for the last time from presidency of CWL in 1922 by which time many branches of CWL had sprung up, both in the UK and abroad and its continuing charitable work is a fitting tribute to the organisation's founder.

== Works ==
- "Sketches of Life in Hungary"(1892)
- "Light for New Times"(1902)
- "The School of the Heart"(1904)
- The Fugitives" Longmans, Green and Company(1912)
- "Christian Feminism: a Charter of Rights and Duties"(1916)
- "The Christian Family" Catholic Social Guild(1920)
- "O, Call Back Yesterday" Blackwells(1939) - her autobiography.
