= Saint-Antoine Street =

Street in Montreal, Canada

Coordinates: 45°30′27″N 73°33′25″W

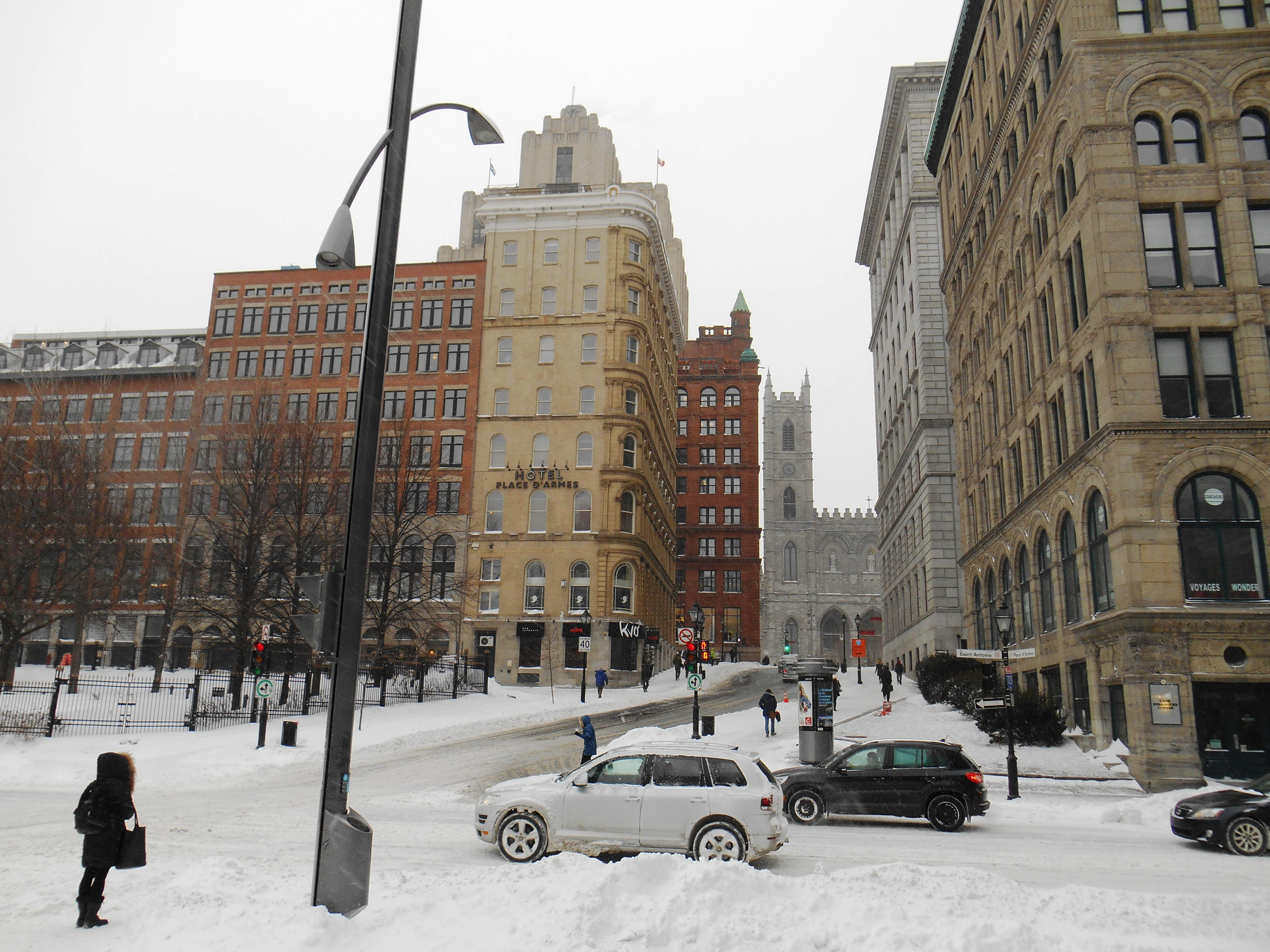
- Interactive map of Saint-Antoine Street
- Native name: Rue Saint-Antoine (French)
- Former names: rue des Menuisiers; Chemin de la Petite-Rivière rue du Canal; Craig Street (1817-1976)
- Length: 5.9 km (3.7 mi)
- Location: Montreal and Westmount, Quebec, Canada
- West end: Saint Jacques Street, Saint-Henri
- Major junctions: R-112 Peel Street; R-136 as service lane A-10 Robert-Bourassa Boulevard
- East end: Notre-Dame Street, Centre-Sud

Construction
- Construction start: 1799

Saint-Antoine Street (officially in French: Rue Saint-Antoine), formerly known as Craig Street, is a street located in Montreal, Quebec, Canada. It runs to the south of Downtown Montreal and north of Old Montreal and Griffintown and Saint-Henri. It crosses the Quartier international de Montréal. Between Atwater Avenue and Greene Avenue, the north side of the street is in Westmount.

Saint-Antoine Street is primarily a one-way street with traffic running westbound only from Jean d'Estrées Street (exit from the eastbound Ville-Marie expressway) and eastbound only from Square Victoria. Between these two points, the traffic flows in both directions. The western terminus of Saint Antoine Street is at Saint Jacques Street in Saint-Henri. At the east the street leads onto Boulevard Ville-Marie (the street extension of the Ville-Marie expressway) and onto Notre-Dame Street near the Jacques Cartier Bridge.

== History ==
=== West of Victoria Square ===
West of the original boundaries of Montreal (what is now Old Montreal), Saint Antoine Street was the main thoroughfare of a suburban area known as Faubourg Saint-Antoine, later Saint-Antoine Ward.

=== East of Victoria Square ===
Since 1799, the street was known as rue des Menuisiers, and the street bordered the land reserved for the city's fortifications between Saint Laurent Boulevard and Bleury Street. Following the dismantlement of the fortifications in the first decade of the 19th century, rue des Menuisiers was incorporated as part of a road, 80 feet (24 metres) wide, that the commissioners built between the new Place des Commissaires (now known as Victoria Square) in the west, and Champ de Mars in the east. The road passed above an old river that was converted into a canal after the dismantlement of Montreal's fortifications.

From 1817 to August 1976, this street was named Craig Street, after Sir James Henry Craig, Governor General of British North America and Lieutenant Governor of Lower Canada from 1807 to 1811. The street was renamed in 1976 to bear the same name as its western portion (at a time when there was a tendency in Montreal to rename streets after French figures and places).

== Transit ==
Square-Victoria–OACI, Georges-Vanier and Lucien-L’Allier train station are located on the street while Lionel-Groulx, Lucien-L’Allier, Bonaventure, Gare Centrale, Place-D’Armes and Champ-de-Mars are right nearby. The 36 Monk serves most of the downtown portion of the street.

== Points of interest ==
- Bell Centre
- Palais de justice (Montreal)
- Palais des congrès de Montréal
- Tour de la Bourse
- World Trade Centre Montreal
