= Arthur Henry Neumann =

British explorer (1850–1907)

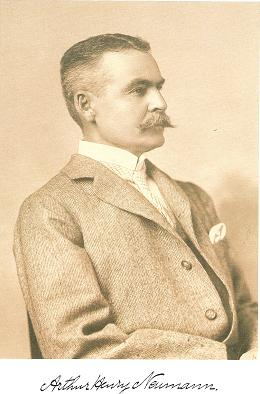
- Arthur Neumann in 1897
- Born: 12 June 1850; Hockliffe, Bedfordshire, England
- Died: 29 May 1907 (aged 56); Westminster, London, England
- Occupations: Hunter, author, soldier, explorer,
- Writing career
- Notable work: Elephant Hunting in East Equatorial Africa

Arthur Henry Neumann (12 June 1850 – 29 May 1907) was an English explorer, hunter, soldier, farmer and travel writer famous for his exploits in Equatorial East Africa. In 1898 he published Elephant Hunting in East Equatorial Africa.

== Early life and exploration ==
Neumann was born in Hockliffe, Bedfordshire, a village four miles east from Leighton Buzzard, the youngest child of seven of the Reverend John Stubbs Neumann and his wife (née) Annie Mary Formby. His father was rector of a rural parish, and the young retiring Neumann would recall 'an attempt I remember to have made to get out of the sight of houses in a secluded part of the common and fancy myself in an uninhabited country' Although it is known that Neumann's brother Formby attended Wadham College, Oxford, Arthur's education is not known and most likely he was educated at home with private tutors.

In 1869 his father who was from a wealthy family of Liverpool salt merchants, retired from his living in Bedfordshire and departed for Italy, a country with a sizeable flock of wealthy British expatriates, for the next five years. This was the spur for his son Arthur to depart to South Africa to begin a life of wanderlust. Neumann declared in later life that life for him had really only begun in 1868: what had gone before, in his opinion, hardly counted. On arriving in Durban on the Natal coast, Neumann found a town that was barely fifty years old with the demeanour of a frontier town. He took a job with a coffee planter near Verulam, KwaZulu-Natal shortly before the deadly Borer Beetle infected the growth and decimated the fledgling industry. Several months of this work was enough for Neumann, and with his brother Charles they struck further north to the lower basin of the Umvoti River. Here they found government land suitable for the growing of tobacco and cotton. However, Arthur failed to settle and headed in 1871 to the newly discovered goldfield in the eastern Transvaal. The fledgling Boer Republic was close to bankruptcy in this period of the 19th century, beset with debt and hostility from the Zulu inhabitants, and the prospect of a gold rush was encouraged. It does not seem to have proved a fruitful period for the young Neumann, who had returned to Natal by 1872.

The subsequent acquisition of property in Natal did little to assuage Neumann's inability to settle and according to his friend the artist and hunter John Guille Millais: After knocking about for some time, he settled in Swaziland, and established a trading there, driving his own wagons with trade goods to and from Natal. This mode of life enabled him to learn wagon driving, the skills required to survive in the bush and to understand the peoples of South Africa by learning to speak several native languages.

== Hunter and soldier ==
In 1877 Neumann took a sabbatical from his life as a merchant and trader to pursue his passion for hunting. He headed for the big game grounds of Swaziland and the low veldt of eastern Transvaal apparently content to lead a solitary life aiming and firing his rifles at the wildlife. Overhunting was already taking its toll in the area and gradually Neumann moved further afield to his ultimate goal of East Africa.

As Neumann continued his quest for big game the uneasy political situation between the Zulus and the British and their Swazi allies began to unravel and a violent uprising was in the offing in Zululand. Neumann with his fluency in the native language, friendship with the Swazi leaders and an intimate knowledge of the terrain was well placed to act on behalf of a reconnoitring party and accepted a government offer of the rank of captain and command of a detachment of scouts in one of the Swazi contingents.

During this troublesome period Neumann met and befriended Norman Magnus MacLeod of MacLeod, one of his life's key friendships. The aristocratic MacLeod, a former soldier in the 74th Highlanders had held a variety of administrative posts in the colony's government and as an avid sportsman of big game had similarly explored the South African hinterland. MacLeod and Neumann formed a tight and resilient partnership and as the situation reached a critical juncture in late 1878 they travelled for a rendezvous with the Swazi king to elicit his support against the Zulu King, Cetewayo.

In January 1879 the Anglo-Zulu War commenced. The defeat of British forces at Isandhlwana led to a forced withdrawal by the British who shortly redeployed with a greater force to overcome the Zulus. During the brief war Neumann performed bravely while serving as a Captain in the Natal Native Contingent, helping consolidate British gains in Transvaal and forging alliances with the Swaziland kingdom.

Neumann spent most of the next decade alternating between his concerns of farming, trading and of course, organising hunting expeditions. He travelled and hunted extensively around the Limpopo and Sabi rivers whilst renting out his farm and leasing land from the Swazi royal family for cattle raising on the borders of Swaziland and Transvaal. In 1885 he was involved in a dispute with the Transvaal Government as to ownership of the land that they deemed was in Transvaal and not in Swaziland as Neumann had believed. Neumann appears to have obfuscated in the hope that the Transvaal authorities in Pretoria would forget him which they did not.

== East Africa ==
By 1890 Neumann had tired of the legal wrangling about ownership of his farms and was in East Africa needing funds to outfit an elephant-hunting expedition. In May 1890 he had been appointed to the General Africa staff of the Imperial British East Africa Company. Neumann from his base in Mombasa placed himself in the vanguard of British involvement within East Africa under the domineering leadership of Frederick Lugard with whom he quickly developed a fractious relationship. In his first four months with the Company Neumann's road gang of fifty men carved their way through the bush opening up the hinterland, forging alliances and enmities as they progressed. Whilst the road was completed it proved a dead end in terms of the trade generated but it did provide Neumann with ease of access to the hunting grounds of the interior.

At the end of 1890 Neumann was part of an expedition by Sir William Mackinnon's chartered company to reconnoitered a proposed railway route to Lake Victoria. Leaving Mombasa on 1 December with the foraging party they travelled across the arid Taru Desert to the East Africa Company fort at Machakos where they waited for the main party before travelling to Dagoretti, close to modern day Nairobi. The rainy conditions meant a difficult expedition ensued around Lake Victoria before the survey was complete at Kisumu. Heading west the party took time to hunt and in Samia Neumann is recorded as killing five elephants and five hippo, an experience that he found exhilarating and led to the decision to become a professional elephant hunter. On his return trip to Mombasa on 25 May 1891 the returning party was attacked by the Maasai in retribution for the confiscation of Maasai cattle by a previous expedition led by Neumann's hunter friend Frederick Jackson. Neumann was wounded in the wrist in the mêlée that saw thirty-eight of his men dead. Once again tiring of his prosaic duties he resigned to fill the post of a magistrate in Zululand.

== Elephant hunter ==
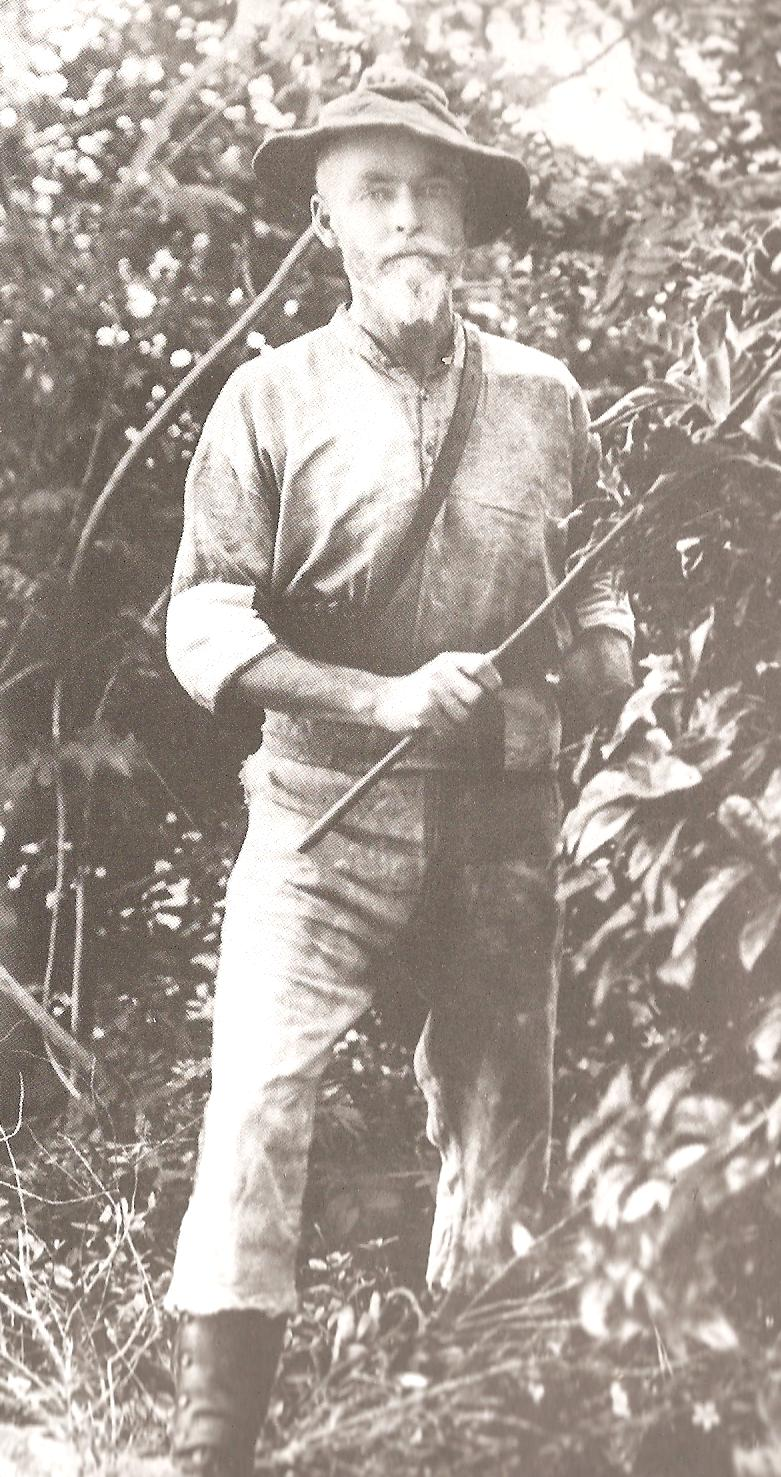
Arthur Henry Neumann c. 1902

At the end of 1893 Neumann returned to Mombasa to begin a career as an ivory trader. The aim of his fifty strong expedition was to travel to Ndorobo where it was believed large herds of elephants awaited. In late December 1893 at a leisurely pace he set out on a voyage of serendipity lasting fourteen months. Initially he followed the old caravan route through Kibwezi before traversing Ukambani, crossing the Tana river valley and then descending the foothills of the Nyambeni Range, a distance of 450 miles from Mombasa and nine weeks by foot. Once he had established his depot Neumann was ready to initiate the hunting using his collection of Gibbs-Farquharson rifles. He moved around the interior for the next few months collecting ivory, surveying and occasionally collecting insects and butterflies in the Meru country.

The worldwide demand for ivory from the British East Africa Protectorate in the late 19th century was high and at its peak. It was, of course a disaster for the elephant but it provided much needed wealth into Equatorial Africa and men such as Neumann were available to satiate the demand. In his memoirs in common to the age in which he lived Neumann makes no reference to the ethics of the trade and concentrates instead on the arduousness of travel and the length of journeys into the interior. One such arduous journey in August 1896 witnessed the destruction by Neumann of fourteen elephants, his largest bag. Revealingly he was disappointed with his performance: "I did not consider I had done as well as I ought.... But I excused myself, to a certain extent in that I was out of health". He was more satisfied with the overall haul from the expedition of forty sets of tusks.

His long-term aim to reach Lake Rudolf (now known as Lake Turkana) was attained on an expedition conducted in 1895. However the hunting around Lake Rudolf was not a success as the terrain was difficult and a bitter wind blew. On New Year's Day 1896 his personal servant, Shebane, was killed by a crocodile whilst bathing and many of his asses were stricken from the bite of the Tsetse fly. Neumann records that he downed a number of large animals before his gun misfired allowing an angry cow elephant to maul him. His injuries were severe enough to force a recuperation period lasting several months during which he could not take solids with any comfort. It curtailed the hunting but he made use of his time collecting specimens in the Lorogi Mountains for the British Museum including a previously unrecorded race of hartebeest to which the name Bubalis Neumannii was ascribed. He returned to Mombasa with the ivory and the specimens in October 1896 in poor physical health and sporting an injured and withered arm.

== Publication of Elephant Hunting in East Equatorial Africa ==
Neumann returned to Britain in 1897 where he recuperated and enjoyed his notoriety for the following two years. As was in his nature he pursued a peripatetic existence. He visited the Macleod stronghold of Dunvegan Castle, where he wrote of his exploits and published them as Elephant Hunting in East Equatorial Africa, a well-received autobiography that the Edinburgh Review described thus; we have seldom read a more exciting narrative than this, and the story of many hairbreadth escapes is told with a straightforward simplicity that commands implicit credence. Neumann was not one to play down his exploits and his memoirs were widely read by a public more than willing to lap up tales of derring-do from the Empire. The book is enhanced by the work of three eminent wildlife artists, his friend John Guille Millais, Edmund Caldwell and George Edward Lodge and was a lavish publication. It secured Neumann's name as an elephant hunter and establishment figure. That this reputation was based on a modest score of elephants made no difference. Neumann also cultivated a reputation as an author of articles on wildlife and an authority on the wildlife of Africa. Supported by the scientific studies included in his book he was acknowledged as a serious zoologist.

== Boer War ==
In October 1899 the start of the Boer War between the Boer Republics and Great Britain witnessed Neumann returning to South Africa where he enlisted in the newly formed South African Light Horse. His knowledge of Africa and in particular his experience in the Zulu War meant that he was given the rank of lieutenant under the command of Colonel Julian Byng. Neumann served as part of the Mounted Brigade of the Natal Field Force under Lieutenant-General Douglas Cochrane, taking part in the relief of the besieged town of Ladysmith. He was also present at the Battle of the Tugela Heights and at a skirmish on Bastion Hill where according to J.G. Millais he was at the head of his troop. Neumann did not see out the end of the South African War returning to Britain sometime in 1901.

== Final years in East Africa ==
After an unsatisfactory period in South Africa where he was thwarted in his attempt to obtain a government post in Transvaal he returned to East Africa where he intended to resume his elephant hunting activities. In August 1901 he is recorded as visiting his old friend Frederick Jackson, now Acting Commissioner of Uganda in Entebbe, and that his intention was to head north to hunt near the Abyssinian border. In fact Neumann probably returned shortly after to Britain as he is recorded buying a large-bore, double-barreled rifle from the Southwark gunsmith John Rigby & Company whilst staying at the Union Club. He was present at a Norfolk shooting party in late 1901 that was attended by several notable hunters of the period including Frederick Selous and J.G. Millais whom he knew and Abel Chapman who he met for the first time.

According to Millais early in 1902 he once again returned to East Africa where he stayed in Mount Kenya country for five years periodically heading north to hunt bull elephants. He ranged through the Lorian Swamp, Lake Rudolf and northern Gwaso Nyiro during 1903 and 1904 with diminishing returns. The ivory trade though still profitable was in decline as competition from Abyssinians and Somalis made for an increasingly difficult political position. Neumann with his affinity for Ndorobo people of East Africa was reluctantly drawn into political conflicts that eventually undermined his position. As 1905 ended his financial return from ivory was in sharp decline. During the year he shot a total of just fifteen elephants and bartered a few more tusks from the Ndorobo and the Sabur. Neumann who by this time was in poor shape was also receiving criticism from the growing lobby in the colony that were against the uncontrolled hunting of big game. Neumann began to feel embattled and bitter that he was a pariah to the 'Game Preserving Society' as he called his opponents. He responded by publishing a pamphlet in which he put forward his ideas on how the ivory trade and illegitimate elephant hunting could be controlled. He also offered his services once again as a government border agent in return for a salary that included his right to collect ivory. It was to no avail and after a final hunting trip to Lake Rudolf in 1906 it became clear that his days as an elephant hunter were over.

== Death in London ==
In September 1906 Neumann sailed for the UK. On board was his stockpile of ivory that he sold for the reasonable sum of £4,500 retaining a few choice pieces for friends, including Millais, with whom he stayed at Horsham in April 1907. Millais' son Raoul Millais, later also an artist and hunter, remembered him as 'a jolly little man, lots of fun and very good with children'.

The solitary Neumann had intent to return to East Africa and held a meeting with James Hayes Sadler, the senior diplomat in East Africa at the Colonial Office in London with the intention of negotiating the grant of land and a government post in the Guaso Nyiro River area of the Protectorate. This was agreed at the end of May, but the grant was never enacted as on 29 May after writing a brief note Neumann committed suicide by gunshot at his lodgings in central London.

== See also ==
- List of famous big game hunters
