= Millais =

Millais is a surname, a given name, and a place name. It may refer to:

== People ==
=== with Millais as surname ===
- Hugh Millais (1929–2009), British author and actor
- Ivy Millais (1883-1969), British actress
- John Guille Millais (1865–1931), British artist, naturalist, gardener and travel writer
- Millais baronets, several people, including:
  - John Everett Millais (1829–1896), English painter and illustrator
  - Raoul Millais (1901–1999), British portrait painter, equestrian artist and sportsman

=== with Millais as a given name ===
- Millais Culpin (1874–1952), British psychologist

== Places ==
- Millais School, English girls' school (Horsham, West Sussex)
