= Millay =

Millay may refer to:

== People ==
- Diana Millay (1940-2021), American actress
- Edna St. Vincent Millay (1892–1950), American lyrical poet and playwright
- George Millay (1929–2006), American businessman
- Tamara Millay (born 1967), Missouri politician

=== Fictional characters ===
- Millay, a character in the role playing game Suikoden IV
- Maeve Millay, a character in the TV series Westworld

== Places ==
- Millay, Nièvre, a commune in the Nièvre department of France

== Organizations ==
- Millay Colony for the Arts, an artists' colony in Austerlitz, NY
- Edna St. Vincent Millay Society, which holds the intellectual rights to the poet's work and runs Steepletop, the poet's house museum, in Austerlitz, New York

== See also ==
- Millais (disambiguation)
