= Shikar Club =

International sporting club

The Shikar Club (Note: The name of the Shikar Club comes from the Hindi word for hunting reflecting the early link with hunting in the Indian sub-continent.) is an international sporting club founded in London in 1909 by Old Boys of Eton and Rugby to champion the cause of hunting and in particular big game hunting. Its founding members included Frederick Courtney Selous, P.B. van der Byl and Charles Edward Radclyffe.

== Inauguration ==
On 7 June 1909, at the Café Royal in London's Regent Street, more than seventy well-known hunting and shooting men met at the inaugural dinner of the Shikar Club. The event was presided over by the Earl of Lonsdale. The Field magazine's June 1909 issue devoted a page and a half to a description of the event. After the meal a committee was formed to write a constitution of the Club at their leisure.

The Shikar Club promoted shooting at international shooting exhibitions with the clear expression of big game hunting within legitimate class and national identities.

== Membership ==
The membership of the club included many high-ranking military men, such as Sir Claude Champion de Crespigny, described as "one of the hardest and pluckiest men in England… ready to box, ride, walk, run, shoot, fence, sail or swim with anyone over fifty on equal terms".

The society once championed big-game hunters, including Abel Chapman, Alfred Pease, Hilary Hook, the Marquess of Valdueza, and Maurice Egerton. Some members, such as Thomas Alexander Barns, H. A. Bryden, and C. W. L. Bulpett, published books and articles on hunting and exploring; while others, such as John Guille Millais, were artists or naturalists.

As of 2023, the Shikar Club continues to exist and meets regularly at the Savoy Hotel, London, for the purposes of continuing the tradition of hunting and shooting. The emphasis today is on sustainable hunting and the conservation of wildlife. Prince Philip, Duke of Edinburgh, was a member until his death in 2021.
