= Thomas Alexander Barns =

English businessman and naturalist (1881–1930)

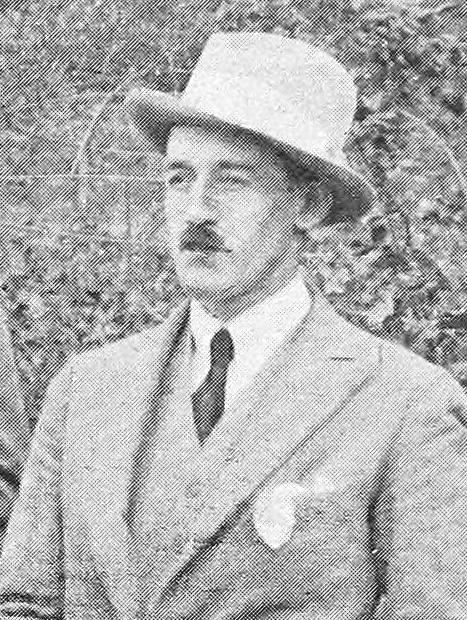
- Barns in 1920
- Born: 4 June 1881; Bletchingley, Surrey, England
- Died: 4 March 1930 (aged 48); Chicago, Illinois, United States
- Other names: T. A. Barns, T. Alexander Barns, Alexander Barns
- Education: St John's College, Oxford
- Occupation: naturalist
- Known for: expeditions in Africa
- Spouse: Margery Cory

Thomas Alexander Barns FZS FES (4 June 1881 – 4 March 1930), known in his private life as Alexander Barns, was an English businessman, explorer, big game hunter, author, artist, naturalist and lecturer connected with the opening up of Central Africa by Europeans in the early 20th century.

The amateur entomologist James John Joicey commissioned Barns to collect specimens of lepidoptera in Africa on his behalf.

== Early life and background ==
The second son of the Rev. William Amos Barns, by his marriage to Eva Cecilia Buckworth, Barns was born at Bletchingley, Surrey, in 1881 and educated at Cranleigh School. His father was a Church of England clergyman and a graduate of St John's College, Oxford. His mother, Eva Cecilia Buckworth, was the daughter of the Rev. Thomas Everard Buckworth (born 1822), Rector of Norbury, Staffordshire, whose mother Helena Hare Clarke was one of the sisters of General Sir John Clarke (1787–1854), a veteran of the Peninsular Wars. In 1868, at the age of thirteen, Eva Cecilia had been awarded the Royal Humane Society's Silver Medal for saving her ten-year-old sister Blanche Rosa from drowning in a pool of the River Erme at Ivy Bridge, Devon. She then needed to be saved herself by her governess.

== Career ==
In 1898, at the age of seventeen, Barns went to Africa as an assistant manager to the Nyasaland Coffee Company. From 1900 to 1903 he was agent for the Tanganyika Concessions in Northern Rhodesia, where he also worked in ranching and organised expeditions to German and Portuguese East Africa, shot elephants, traded ivory, and collected zoological specimens for museums, such as a large African elephant for the South Kensington Museum.

During First World War he served in the German East African Campaign.

Between 1919 and 1922 Barns led three Trans-African Research Expeditions through the Belgian Congo and the Tanganyika Territory. He became the first Englishman to describe the Ngorongoro Crater, a volcanic caldera in the Crater Highlands of what is now Tanzania, at that time the largest known crater in the world.

In his The Wonderland of the Eastern Congo (1922), Barns was an early observer of mountain gorillas and reported that he had observed them living in large troops and that all such troops included at least two adult females with young of different ages. Dead gorillas featured heavily in his travel books; by the mid-1920s he was setting up his own adventure tours offering clients the chance to hunt mountain gorillas.

Some of Barns's expeditions to Africa were sponsored by James John Joicey, an amateur entomologist. One of these trips lasted a year, when travelling with his wife Barns collected many specimens of Lepidoptera for Joicey's Hill Museum at Witley. Barns's book Across the Great Craterland to the Congo (1924) followed an expedition to the Belgian Congo driven by the search for a rare giant Papilio butterfly, which Barns called "the Antizox". He explained the name as "a play on the two names antimachus and zalmoxis". On a previous expedition to the Congo for Joicey Barns had observed an example floating on the water just out of his reach. Barns's report of the butterfly was so extraordinary that Joicey sent him back to the Congo in search of it, but no specimen was captured.

Barns was a member of the African Society, the Shikar Club, and the National Geographic Society of Washington, D.C., and a correspondent for The African World, as well as publishing several books about Africa. In 1921 he was elected a Fellow of the Entomological Society of London and was already a Fellow of the Zoological Society. He was then living in Bayswater, London.

Mrs. T. Alexander Barns in Africa, 1921.

He married Margery, the daughter of Frederick Cory, and they had one son and one daughter. His first wife, H. Elizabeth Barns, published the book "Naju of the Nile" in 1924. His wife was an active participant in his expeditions to Africa to collect butterflies. According to Sir Alan Lascelles, private secretary to Edward VIII when he was the Prince of Wales, Mrs. Barnes was seduced by the future King of England during the Prince's tour of Africa in 1928.

He died in Chicago in 1930, struck by a taxi-cab driver. An obituary in The Entomologist called him "A notable and inspiring figure among the naturalists, geographers and sportsmen of Africa".

== Publications ==
- The Wonderland of the Eastern Congo: the region of snow-crowned volcanoes, the pygmies, the giant gorilla, and the okapi, introduced by H. H. Johnston (1922)
- Tales of the Ivory Trade (London: Mills & Boon, 1923)
- Across the Great Craterland to the Congo, introduced by J. W. Gregory (1924)
- An African Eldorado, the Belgian Congo, introduced by Louis Franck (1926)
- Angolan Sketches (London: Methuen & Company, 1928)
