= Frederick Selous =

British explorer, and conservationist (1851–1917)

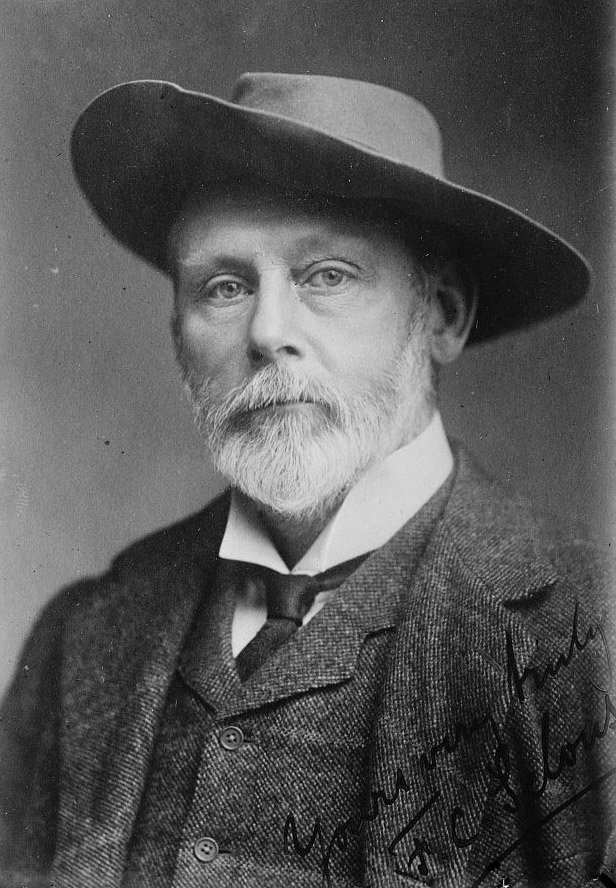
- Selous circa 1911
- Born: Frederick Courteney Selous; 31 December 1851; London, England
- Died: 4 January 1917 (aged 65); Behobeho, German East Africa (now the Selous Game Reserve in southeastern Tanzania)
- Spouse: Mary Maddy (m. 1894)
- Military career
- Allegiance: United Kingdom
- Rank: Captain
- Commands: Bulawayo Field Force, Matabeleland; 25th Royal Fusiliers, East Africa
- Conflicts: First Matabele War; Second Matabele War; World War I; East African Campaign †
- Awards: Founder's Medal of the Royal Geographical Society, British South Africa Company Medal; Distinguished Service Order
- Other work: Famous African hunter and explorer, conservationist, writer

Frederick Courteney Selous, DSO (/səˈluː/; 31 December 1851 – 4 January 1917) was a British explorer, army officer, professional hunter, and conservationist, famous for his exploits in Southeast Africa. His real-life adventures inspired Sir Henry Rider Haggard to create the fictional character Allan Quatermain. Selous was a friend of Theodore Roosevelt, Cecil Rhodes and Frederick Russell Burnham. He was pre-eminent within a group of big game hunters that included Abel Chapman and Arthur Henry Neumann. He was the older brother of the ornithologist and writer Edmund Selous.

== Early life and exploration ==
Frederick Courteney Selous was born on 31 December 1851 at Regent's Park, London, as one of the five children of an upper middle class family, the third-generation descendant of a Huguenot immigrant. His father, Frederick Lokes Slous (original spelling) (1802–1892), was Chairman of the London Stock Exchange, and his mother, Ann Holgate Sherborn (1827–1913), was a published poet. One of his uncles was a painter, Henry Courtney Selous. Frederick had three sisters (Florence (born 1850), Annie Berryman (born 1853), and Sybil Jane (born 1862)), and one brother (Edmund Selous (1857–1934)) who became a famous ornithologist. Frederick's love for the outdoors and wildlife was shared only by his brother, although as adults, in contrast to Frederick's fame as a big-game hunter, Edmund would fervently oppose the killing of animals for sport or scientific collection. All of the family members were artistically inclined, as well as being successful in business.

At 42, Selous settled in Worplesdon near Guildford in Surrey, and married 20-year-old Marie Catherine Gladys Maddy (born 1874), daughter of clergyman Canon Henry William Maddy. They had three sons: Frederick Hatherley Bruce Selous (1898–1918), Harold Sherborn Selous (1899-1954), and Bertrand Selous, who was born prematurely on 6 July 1915 and died five days later.

=== Youth ===
From a young age, Selous was drawn by stories of explorers and their adventures. Furthermore, while in school, he started establishing a personal collection of various bird eggs and studying natural history. One account is related by his schoolmaster at Northamptonshire when Selous was 10 years old:

... on going around the dormitories to see that all was in order, discovered Freddy Selous, lying bare on the floor clothed only in his nightshirt. On being asked the cause of this curious behaviour, he replied "Well, you see, one day I am going to be a hunter in Africa and I am just hardening myself to sleep on the ground."

On 15 January 1867, 15-year-old Selous was one of the survivors of the Regent's Park skating disaster, when the ice covering the local lake broke with around 200 skaters on it, leaving 40 dead by drowning and freezing. He escaped by crawling on broken ice slabs to the shore.

He was educated at Bruce Castle School, Tottenham, then at Rugby. His parents hoped that he would become a doctor, and in 1868, he went to Switzerland to study medicine. However, his love for natural history led him to study the ways of wild animals in their native habitat. His imagination was strongly fuelled by the literature of African exploration and hunting, Dr. David Livingstone, and William Charles Baldwin in particular. He moved to Prussia, where he learned German and began collecting butterflies.

=== African exploration ===
Going to South Africa when he was 19, he travelled from the Cape of Good Hope to Matabeleland, which he reached early in 1872, and where (according to his own account) he was granted permission by Lobengula, King of the Ndebele, to shoot game anywhere in his dominions.

From then until 1890, Selous hunted and explored over the little-known regions north of the Transvaal and south of the Congo Basin (with a few brief intervals spent in Britain), shooting African elephants and collecting specimens of all kinds for museums and private collections. His travels added greatly to the knowledge of the country now known as Zimbabwe. He made valuable ethnological investigations, and throughout his wanderings—often among people who had never previously seen a white man—he maintained cordial relations with the chiefs and tribes, winning their confidence and esteem, notably so in the case of Lobengula.

In 1890, Selous entered the service of the British South Africa Company, at the request of magnate Cecil Rhodes, acting as a guide to the pioneer expedition to Mashonaland. Over 640 km (400 mi) of road were constructed through a country of forest, mountain, and swamp. He then went east to Manicaland, concluding arrangements that brought the country there under British control. Coming to England in December 1892, he was awarded the Founder's Medal of the Royal Geographical Society in recognition of his extensive explorations and surveys, of which he gave a summary in a journal article entitled "Twenty Years in Zambesia".

== Military career ==
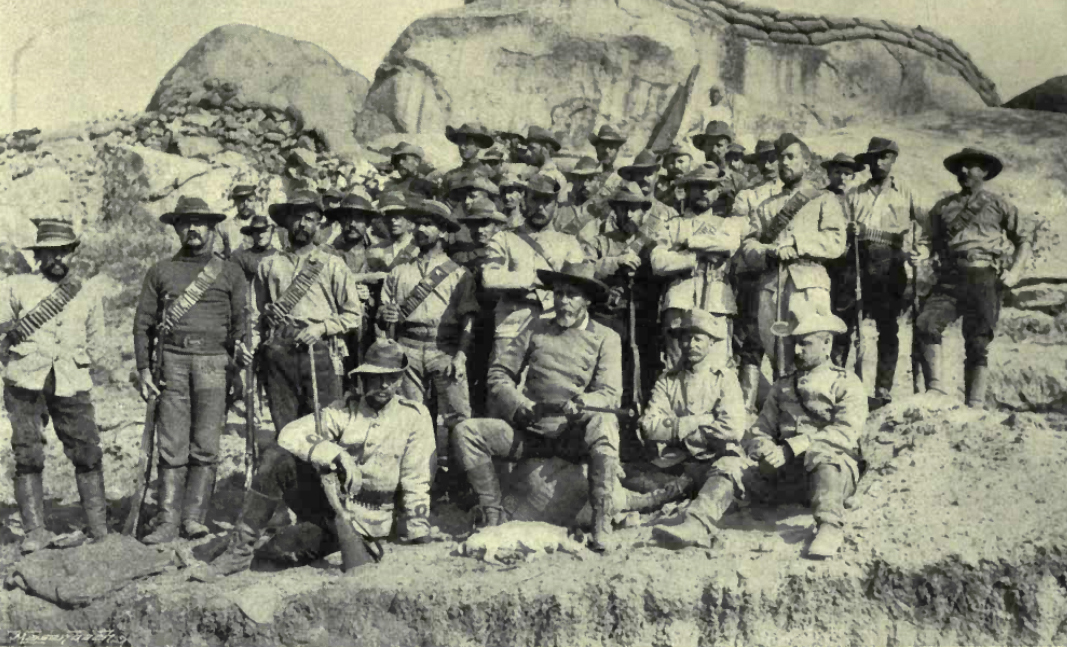
Selous (front seated) leader of H Troops of Bulawayo Field Force, Matabeleland, 1890s.

=== Rhodesia and First World War ===
Selous returned to Africa to take part in the First Matabele War of 1893 and was wounded during the advance on Bulawayo. It was during this advance that he first met fellow scout Frederick Russell Burnham, who had only just arrived in Africa and who continued on with the small scouting party to Bulawayo and observed the deliberate destruction of the Ndebele settlement as ordered by Lobengula.

Selous returned to England, and married Marie Maddy in 1894. In 1896 he returned to Africa with his wife and settled on a landed property in Essexvale, Matabeleland, overlooking the Ncema River. When the Second Matabele War broke out, Selous took a prominent part in the fighting which followed, serving as a leader in the Bulawayo Field Force, and published an account of the campaign entitled Sunshine and Storm in Rhodesia (1896). It was during this time that he met and fought alongside Robert Baden-Powell, who was then a Major and newly appointed to the British Army headquarters staff in Matabeleland.

During the First World War, after initially being rejected on account of his age (64), Selous rejoined the British Army as a subaltern and saw active service in the fighting against German colonial forces in the East Africa Campaign. On 23 August 1915, he was promoted to captain in the uniquely-composed 25th (Frontiersmen) Battalion, Royal Fusiliers, and on 26 September 1916 was awarded the Distinguished Service Order, the citation reading:

Capt. Frederick Courteney Selous, Royal Fusiliers.

For conspicuous gallantry, resource and endurance.

He has set a magnificent example to all ranks, and the value of his services with his battalion cannot be over-estimated.

=== Death and legacy ===
On 4 January 1917, Selous was fighting on the banks of the Rufiji River against German colonial Schutztruppen, which outnumbered his troops five to one. That morning, he was creeping forward in combat during a minor engagement in which he raised his head and binoculars to locate the enemy. He was shot in the head by a German sniper and was killed instantly.

Upon getting the news, former US President Theodore Roosevelt, his close friend, wrote:

He led a singularly adventurous and fascinating life, with just the right alternations between the wilderness and civilization. He helped spread the borders of his people's land. He added much to the sum of human knowledge and interest. He closed his life exactly as such a life ought to be closed, by dying in battle for his country while rendering her valiant and effective service. Who could wish a better life or a better death, or desire to leave a more honorable heritage to his family and his nation?

He was buried under a tamarind tree near the place of his death, at Chokawali on the Rufiji River, in today's Selous Game Reserve, Tanzania, in a modest, flat stone grave with a simple bronze plaque reading: "CAPTAIN F.C. SELOUS D.S.O., 25TH ROYAL FUSILIERS, KILLED IN ACTION 4.1.17." Exactly a year later, on 4 January 1918, his son, Captain Frederick Hatherley Bruce MC, who was a pilot in the Royal Flying Corps, was killed in a flight over Menin Road, Belgium.

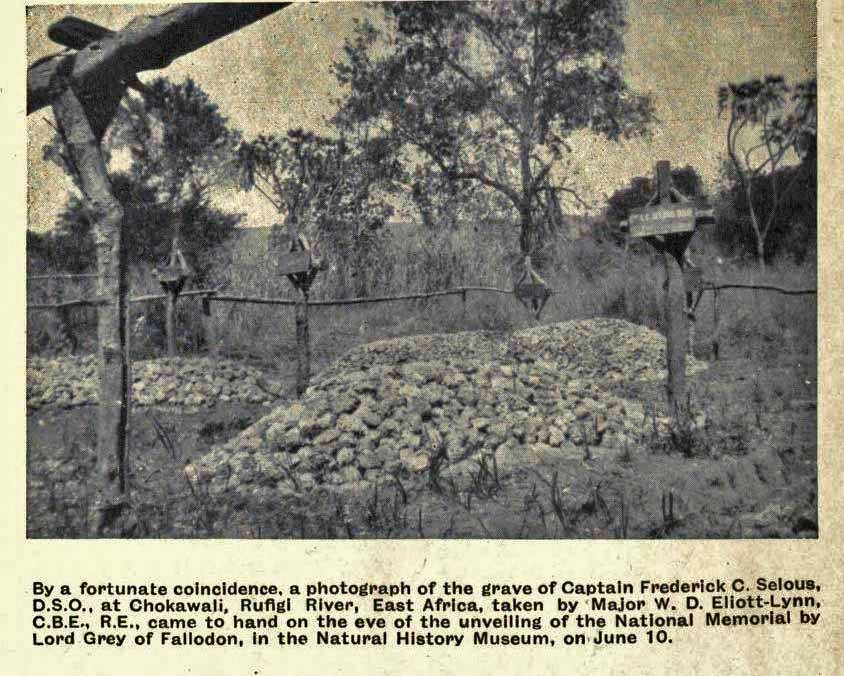
Grave of Frederick C. Selous

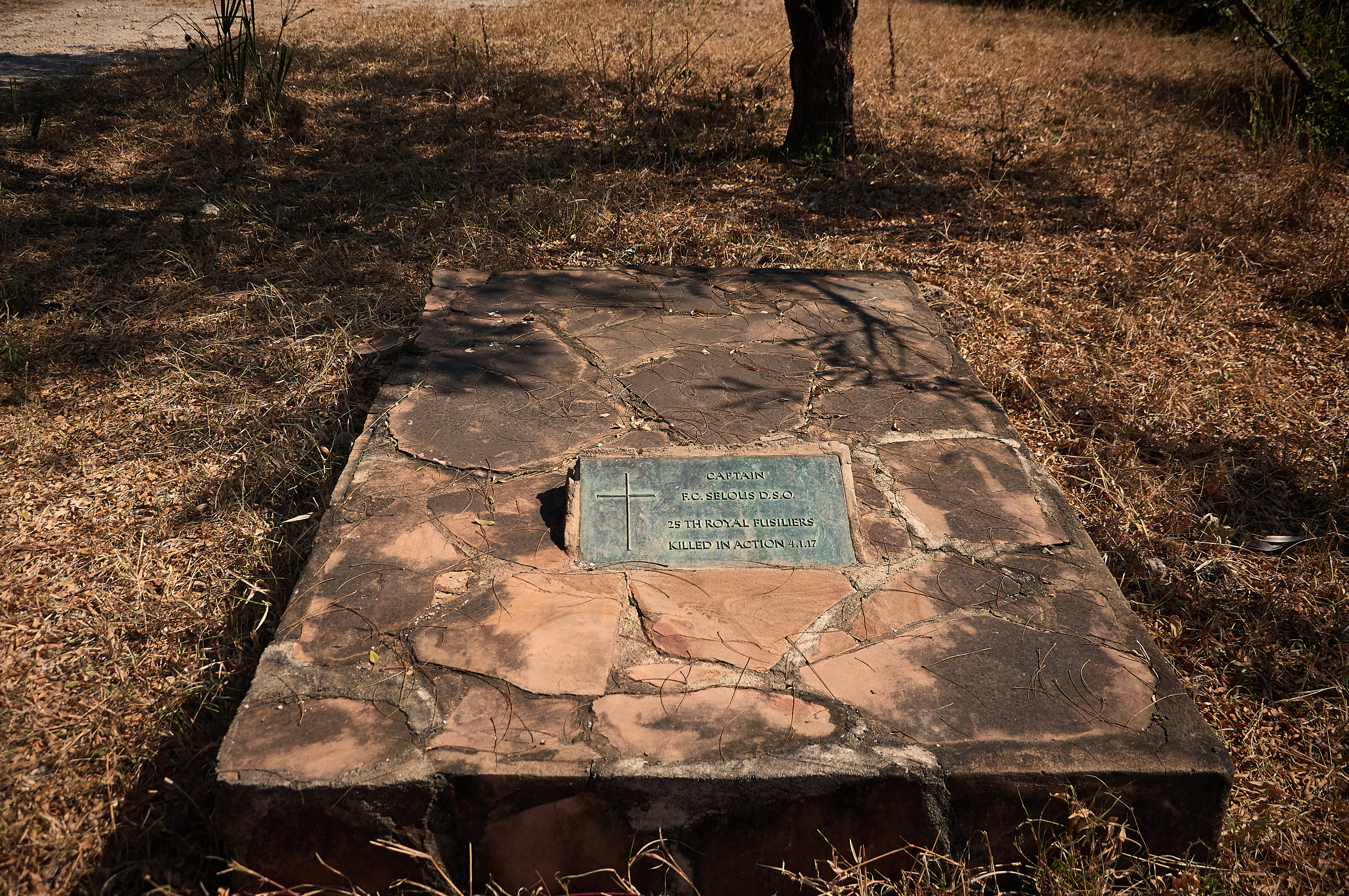
Grave of Frederick Courtenay Selous, contemporary look

His private collection of trophies was given by his widow to the British Natural History Museum, where in June 1920 a national memorial to him was unveiled, a bronze half-figure by William Colton. A Selous Scholarship was also founded at his old school, Rugby.

== Hunter, naturalist and conservationist ==
A studio portrait of young Selous with his Boer 4 bore elephant gun and African spear, 1870s.

=== Hunting icon ===
Selous is remembered for his powerful ties, such as those with Theodore Roosevelt and Cecil Rhodes, as well as for his military achievements and the books that he left behind. However, he is best remembered as one of the world's most revered hunters, as he pursued big-game hunting in his southern African homelands and in wildernesses worldwide.

Accounts of his youth are filled with stories of trespassing, poaching, and brawling, almost all within romanticised and humorous portrayals, but one in particular from 1870 stands out as more serious. In Wiesbaden, Prussia, he knocked unconscious a Prussian game warden who tackled him while he was stealing buzzard eggs for his collection, and he had to leave the country at once to avoid imprisonment. Then, he moved to Austria, and in Salzburg, he went big game hunting for the first time in the nearby Alps, where he shot two chamois.

On 4 September 1871, at the age of 19, he left England with £400 in his pocket and was determined to earn his living as a professional elephant hunter. By the age of 25, he was known across South Africa as one of the most successful ivory hunters of the day.

Selous journeyed in pursuit of big game to Europe (Bavaria, Germany in 1870, Transylvania, then Hungary but now Romania in 1899, Mull Island in 1894, Sardinia in 1902, Norway in 1907), Asia (Turkey, Persia, Caucasus in 1894–95, 1897, 1907), North America (Wyoming, Rocky Mountains in 1897 and 1898, Eastern Canada in 1900–1901, 1905, Alaska and Yukon in 1904, 1905) and the "dark continent" in a territory that extends from today's South Africa and Namibia all the way up into central Sudan where he collected specimens of virtually every medium and large African mammal species.

On 2 May 1902, Selous was elected Associate Member of the Boone and Crockett Club, a wildlife conservation organisation founded by Theodore Roosevelt and George Bird Grinnell in 1887.

Theodore Roosevelt and Selous in Africa, ca 1909.

In 1909–1910, Selous accompanied American ex-president Roosevelt in his famous African safari. Contrary to popular belief, Selous did not lead Roosevelt's 1909 expedition to British East Africa, the Congo, and Egypt. While Selous was a member of this expedition from time to time and helped organise the safari's logistics, the excursion was in fact led by R. J. Cunninghame. Roosevelt wrote of Selous:

Mr Selous is the last of the big game hunters of Southern Africa; the last of the mighty hunters whose experience lay in the greatest hunting ground which this world has seen since civilized man has appeared herein.

In 1909, Selous co-founded the Shikar Club, a big-game hunters' association, with two other British Army Captains, Charles Edward Radclyffe and P. B. Vanderbyl, and regularly met at the Savoy Hotel in London. The association's president was The 5th Earl of Lonsdale; another founding member included the artist, explorer, and Selous biographer John Guille Millais.

In 1910, he represented Britain at the Congress of Field Sports in Vienna.

He was a rifleman icon and a valued expert in firearms. Early in his hunting career, in the mid-1870s, Selous favored a four bore black powder muzzleloader for killing an elephant, a 6 kg (13 lb) short-barrelled musket firing a 110 g (1/4 lb) bullet with as much as 20 drachms (35 g; 550 gr) of black powder, one of the largest hunting calibres fabricated. Between 1874 and 1876 he killed seventy-eight elephants with that gun, but eventually, there was a double loading incident together with other recoil problems from it, and he finally gave it up as too "upsetting my nerve". He used a ten-bore muzzleloader to hunt lions.

After black powder muzzleloader firearms became obsolete, he adopted a breech-loading 10 bore as shown in "A Hunters Wanderings in Africa" and by 1880 he was using his favorite, black powder breech-loading rifle a .461 No 1 Gibbs / Metford / Farquharson single shot later he was approached by both Birmingham and London gunmakers in hopes of his endorsement, with Holland and Holland providing two Holland and Woodward patent single-shot rifles (often confused in photos as Farquharson's) in the two calibers: a 303 and a 375 2 1/2" and later a .425 Westley Richards bolt-action rifle. There are quotes as to how Selous was not a crack shot, but a rather ordinary marksman, yet most agree that was just another personal statement of modesty from Selous himself. Regardless, he remains an iconic rifleman figure and, following in the tradition of others, the German gunmaker Blaser and the Italian gunmaker Perugini Visini chose to name their top line safari rifles the Selous after him.

=== Naturalist ===
Many of the Selous trophies entered into museums and international taxidermy and natural-history collections, notably that of the Natural History Museum in London. In their Selous Collection they have 524 mammals from three continents, all shot by him, including 19 lions. In the last year of his life, while in combat in 1916, he was known to carry his butterfly net in the evening and collect specimens, for the same institution. Overall, more than five thousand plants and animal specimens were donated by him to the Natural History section of the British Museum. This collection was held in 1881 in the new Natural History Museum in South Kensington (which became an independent institution in 1963). Here, posthumously in 1920, they unveiled a bronze bust of him in the Main Hall, where it stands to this day. Selous was a member of the British Ornithologists' Union, and collected bird eggs from across Europe, including Iceland; and the Ottoman Empire. He is mentioned widely in foremost taxidermist Rowland Wards catalogues for world's largest animal specimens hunted, where Selous is ranked in many trophy categories, including rhinoceros, elephant and many ungulates. He was awarded the Royal Geographical Society's Founder's Medal in 1893 "in recognition of twenty years' exploration and surveys in South Africa".

In 1896, British zoologist William Edward de Winton (1856–1922), named a new African small Carnivora, Paracynictis selousi or the Selous mongoose, in his honour. Also, a subspecies of the African Sitatunga antelope, (Tragelaphus spekii selousi), bears his name.

=== Conservationist ===
Selous noticed over time how the impact of European hunters was leading to a significant reduction in the amount of game available in Africa. In 1881, he commented that:

Every year elephants were becoming scarcer and wilder south of the Zambezi, so that it had become impossible to make a living by hunting at all.

This realisation led Selous, and other big game hunters of his time, to become keen advocates of faunal conservation. Eventually, colonial governments passed laws enforcing hunting regulations and establishing game reserves, with the aim of preventing the outright extinction of certain species and of preserving animal stocks for future white sportsmen.

The Selous Game Reserve in southeastern Tanzania is a hunting reserve named in his honour. Established in 1922, it covers an area of 54,600 km^{2} (21,100 sq mi) along the rivers Kilombero, Ruaha, and Rufiji. The area first became a hunting reserve in 1905, although it is rarely visited by humans due to the significant presence of the Tsetse fly. In 1982 it was designated a UNESCO World Heritage Site due to the diversity of its wildlife and undisturbed nature.

== Selous as man and character ==
=== Portrait in literature ===
Frederick Courteney Selous's image remains a classic, romantic portrait of a proper Victorian period English gentleman of the colonies, one whose real-life adventures and exploits of almost epic proportions generated successful Lost World and Steampunk genre fictional characters like Allan Quatermain, to a large extent an embodiment of the popular "white hunter" concept of the times; yet he remained a modest and stoic pillar in personality all throughout his life. As for himself, he was featured in the "Young Indiana Jones" and "Rhodes" series. He was widely remembered in real tales of war, exploration, and big game hunting as a balanced blend between gentleman officer and epic wild man.

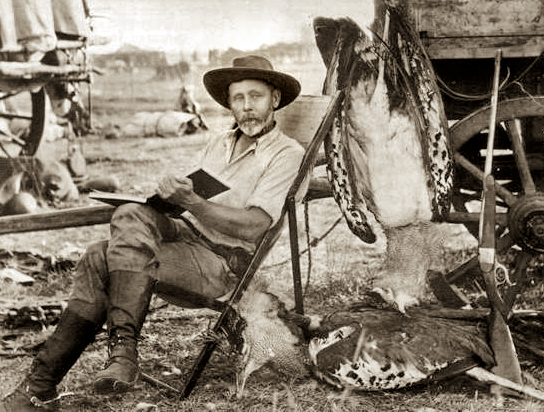
Selous, a gentleman's portrait on African safari, with two shot Kori bustards and his Holland and Woodward patent rifle. The 1890s.

=== Appearance and character ===
He excelled in cricket, rugby, cycling, swimming, and tennis. He loved the outdoors, developing a rugged and robust physique by trekking, packing, marching, and hunting. He was also an accomplished rider, and he waged war and hunted much on horses. To the African locals, he was the "best white runner" (in the endurance aspect, similar as to native bushmen's concept). While in England, all his life he played sports, he still did half-day 100-mile bicycle races when almost sixty years old. Millais, friend and biographer, wrote: "As a sport, he loved cricket most, and played regularly for his club at Worplesdon taking part in all their matches until 1915…'Big Game Hunters' vs. 'Worplesdon' was always a great and solemn occasion."

"If there was one striking feature in his physiognomy it was his wonderful eyes, as clear and as blue as the summer sea. Nearly every one who came in contact with him noticed his eyes. They were the eyes of the man who looks into the beyond vast spaces. Instinctively one saw in them the hunter and the man of wide views. In social intercourse, Selous had a presence that was apt to make other people look insignificant. He was adored by all his friends, and even perfect strangers seemed to come under his magnetism at the first introduction" - J. G. Millais, 1919. All his life, he sported a full beard, which together with his signature hats, makes him an easily recognizable icon: He wore a double Terai grey slouch hat, slightly on the back of his head. Khaki knickerbockers, with no puttees, bare legs, except for his socks and shirt open at the neck, with a knotted handkerchief around the neck to keep the sun off, with a long native stick in his hand. He had a rooted objection to wearing a cork helmet. It is impossible to forget the impression he made. He was as straight as a guardsman, with a broad deep chest, with a beautiful healthy look in his face.

— Capt. R. M. Haines of South African Force, 1917.

== Television accounts ==
- The Young Indiana Jones Chronicles (TV-Series, 1992–1993); played by Paul Freeman
  - British East Africa, September 1909 (1992)
  - Young Indiana Jones and the Phantom Train of Doom, German East Africa, November 1916 (1993)
- Rhodes (TV Mini-Series, 1996); played by Paul Slabolepszy
Studio portrait with his Gibbs Metford rifle and hunting attire.

Selous returning from stag hunt in Turkey, book illustration, 1908.

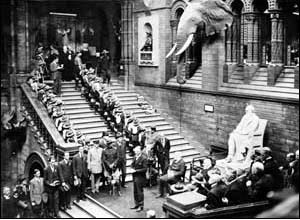
Captain Selous Memorial is in the wall just to the left of the elephant tusks. (The elephant is no longer displayed).

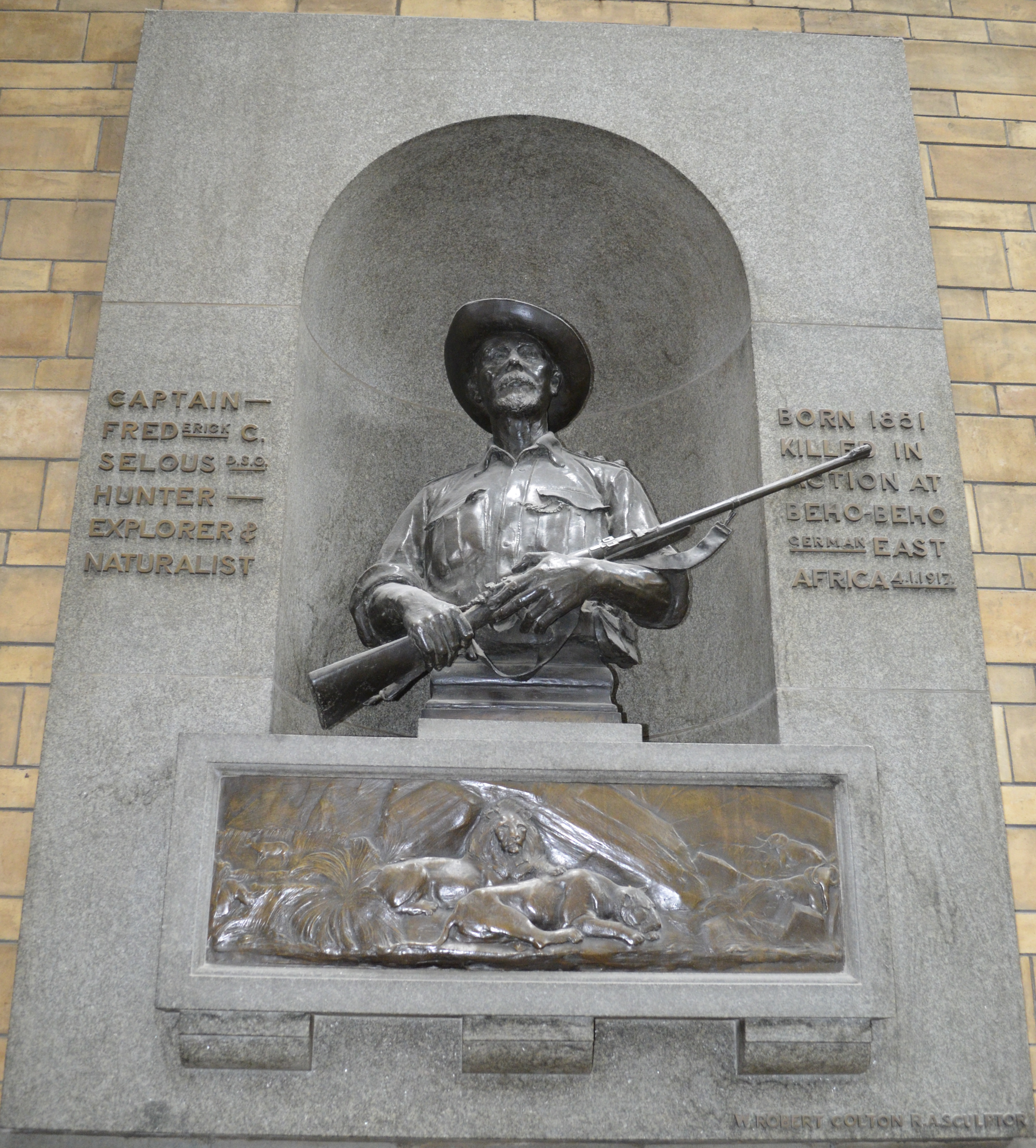
Close up picture of the Selous Memorial in the wall in the main hall of the Natural History Museum

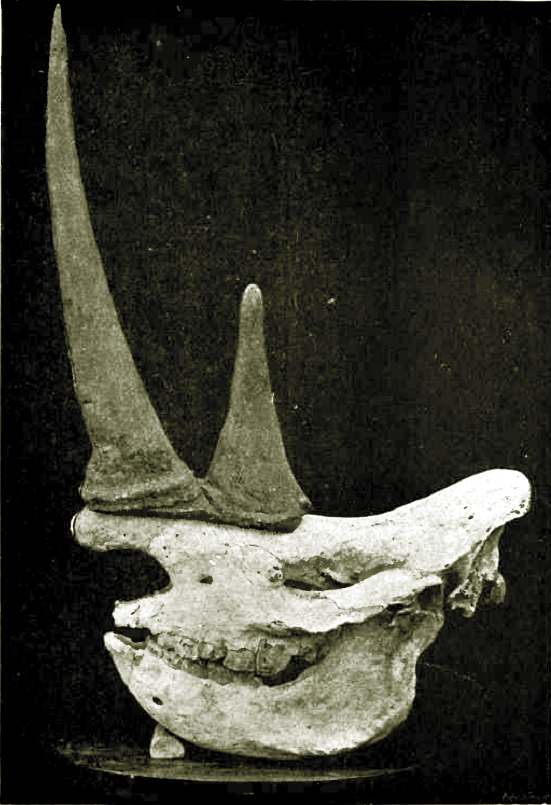
Skull of a record white rhino, shot by Selous in Mashonaland, 1880.

Head of a wapiti, shot by Selous at Cabin Creek, Wyoming, 1897.

== Chronology of works ==
By Frederick Courteney Selous:

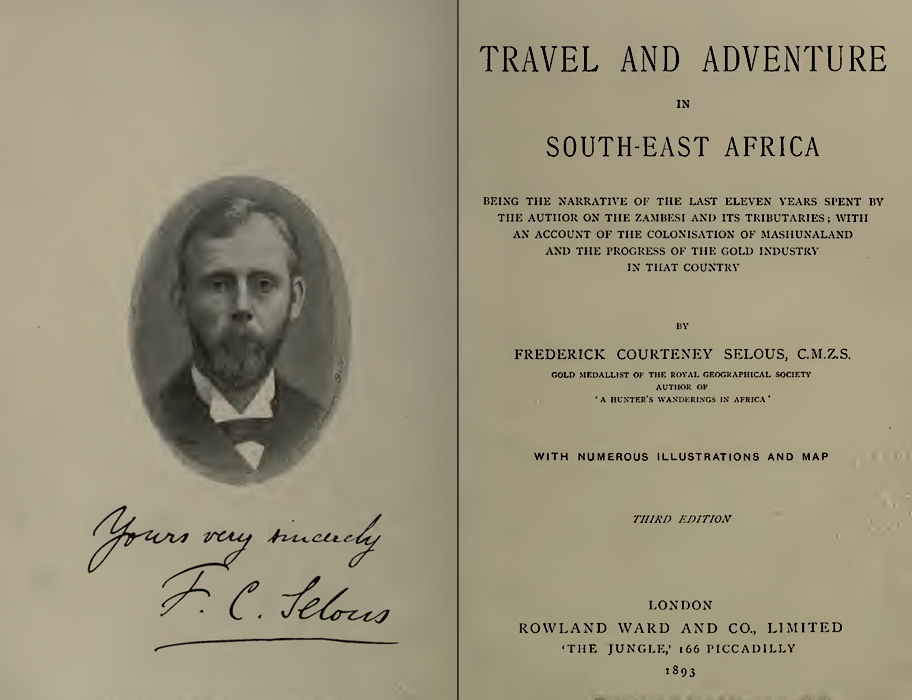
Frontpage of 1st edition Travel And Adventure In South-East Africa, 1893, with Selous portrait and autograph.

- A hunter's wanderings in Africa, being a narrative of nine years spent amongst the game of the far interior of South Africa, containing accounts of explorations beyond the Zambesi, on the river Chobe, and in the Matabele and Mashuna countries, with full notes upon the natural history and present distribution of all the large Mammalia. London: Richard Bentley & Son. 1881. OCLC 5781160 (all editions). The book has had many reprints. Annie Berryman Selous, Frederick's sister drew "ten illustrations, representing the hunting-scenes which embellish my pages, all of which were drawn under my own supervision"; they were engraved in wood by Edward Whymper. Other illustrations were produced by Joseph Smit. (p. viii/ix)
- Travel and Adventure in South-East Africa: Being the Narrative of the Last Eleven Years Spent by the Author on the Zambesi and its Tributaries; With an Account of the Colonisation of Mashunaland and the Progress of the Gold Industry in That Country (1893)
- Sunshine & Storm in Rhodesia: Being a Narrative of Events in Matabeleland Both Before and During the Recent Native Insurrection up to the Date of the Disbandment of the Bulawayo Field Force. (1896), ISBN 978-1-60355-059-8
- Sport & Travel East and West (1900)
- Living Animals of the World; A Popular Natural History With One Thousand Illustrations (London, 1902)
- Newfoundland Guide Book (1905)
- Recent Hunting Trips in British North America (1907)
- African Nature Notes and Reminiscences with foreword by Theodore Roosevelt (1908)
- Africa's Greatest Hunter: the Lost Writings of Frederick C. Selous, edited by Dr James A. Casada (1998)

Selous also wrote the foreword to Africa's most popular man-eater story: The man-eaters of Tsavo and other East African Adventures by Lieut.-Col. J. H. Patterson, D.S.O. With a foreword by Frederick Courteney Selous (London, 1907).

Besides the works mentioned, Selous made numerous contributions to The Geographical Journal, the Field, and other journals.

Writings by others on Frederick Courtenay Selous

- Big Game Shooting, volume. 1, edited by Clive Phillipps-Wolley (London, 1894)
- Records of Big Game by Rowland Ward FZS (London, fifth edition, 1907)
- The life of Frederick Courtenay Selous, D.S.O. by John Guille Millais (London, 1919)
- Catalogue of the Selous Collection of Big Game in the British Museum (Natural History) by J. G. Dollman (London, 1921)
- Big Game Shooting Records by Edgar N. Barclay (London, 1932)
- Frederick C. Selous, A Hunting Legend: Recollections By and About the Great Hunter by Dr. James A. Casada (Safari Press, 2000)
- The Gun at Home and Abroad, vol. 3: Big Game of Africa (London, 1912–1915)
- The African Adventurers by Peter Hathaway Capstick (New York: St. Martins Press, 1992), chapter 1
- The British Big-Game Hunting Tradition, Masculinity and Fraternalism with Particular Reference to "The Shikar Club" by Callum McKenzie (British Society of Sports History, May 2000)
- The Mighty Nimrod: A Life of Frederick Courteney Selous, African Hunter and Adventurer 1851-1917 by Stephen Taylor (London: Collins, 1989)

== See also ==
- Selous Scouts
- Pioneer Column
- Shangani Patrol
- Frederick Russell Burnham
- Second Matabele War
- List of famous big game hunters
