= Portrait of Thomas Oldham Barlow =

1886 painting by John Everett Millais

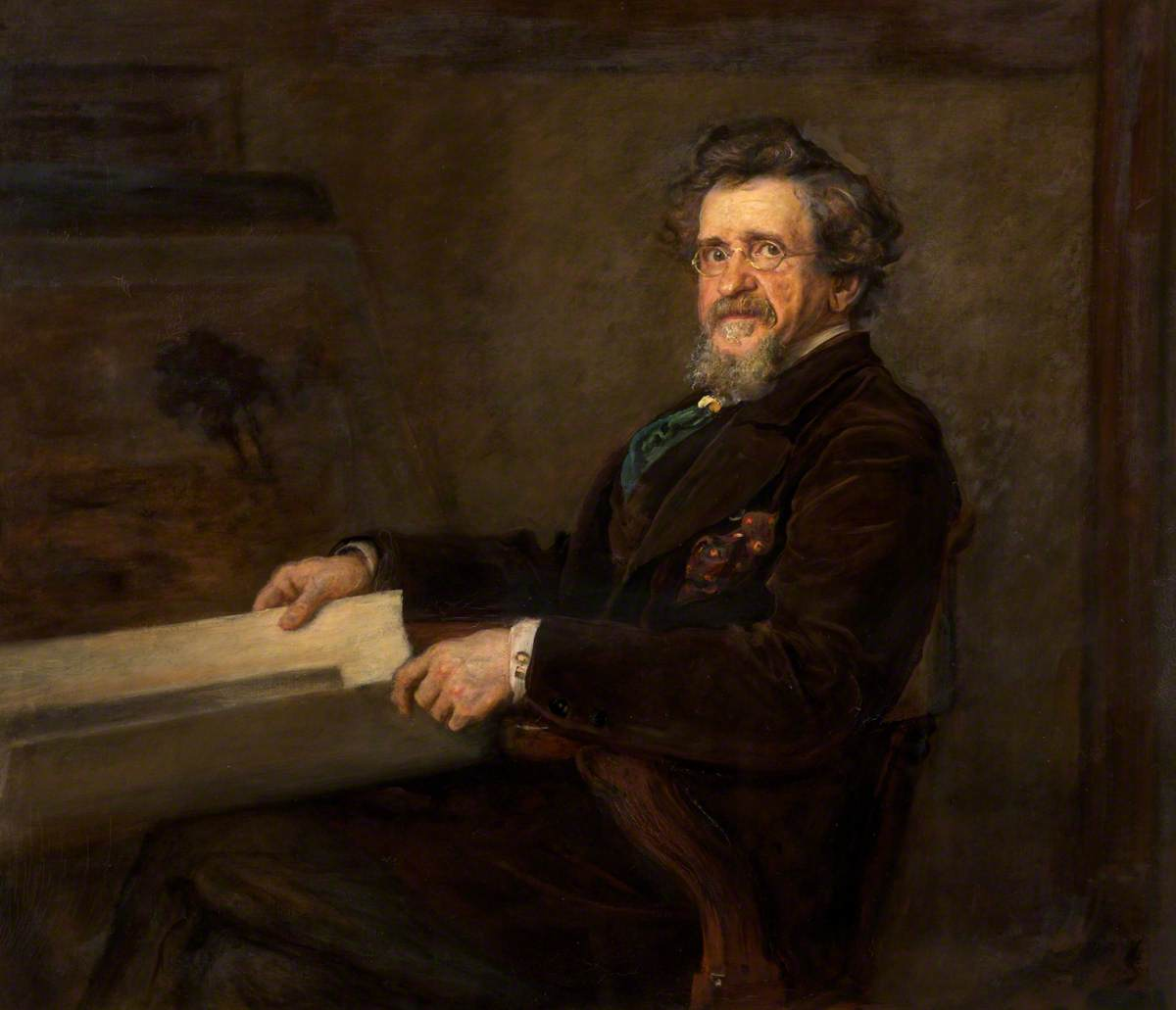
- Artist: John Everett Millais
- Year: 1886
- Type: Oil on canvas
- Subject: Thomas Oldham Barlow
- Dimensions: 100.5 cm × 117 cm (39.6 in × 46 in)
- Location: Gallery Oldham, Oldham, Greater Manchester

Portrait of Thomas Oldham Barlow is an 1886 oil-on-canvas portrait by the British artist John Everett Millais. It depicts the artist and mezzotint engraver Thomas Oldham Barlow, who had previously engraved a number of works by Millais. Barlow is shown seated with a painting in front of him.

Millais had been a prominent member of the Pre-Raphaelite Brotherhood earlier in his career and later became an established member of the Royal Academy of Arts, known in part for his portrait paintings. Portrait of Thomas Oldham Barlow was exhibited at the Royal Academy Exhibition of 1886 at Burlington House in London. The painting is now in the collection of Gallery Oldham in the sitter's home town of Oldham, having been acquired in 1888.

== See also ==
- List of paintings by John Everett Millais

== Bibliography ==
- Barlow, Paul. Time Present and Time Past: The Art of John Everett Millais. Routledge, 2017.
- Hunnisett, Basil. Engraved on Steel: History of Picture Production Using Steel Plates. Taylor & Francis, 1998.
- Wright, Christopher; Gordon, Catherine May; Smith, Mary Peskett. British and Irish Paintings in Public Collections: An Index of British and Irish Oil Paintings by Artists Born Before 1870 in Public and Institutional Collections in the United Kingdom and Ireland. Yale University Press, 2006.
