= Thomas Oldham Barlow =

English mezzotint engraver (1824–1899)

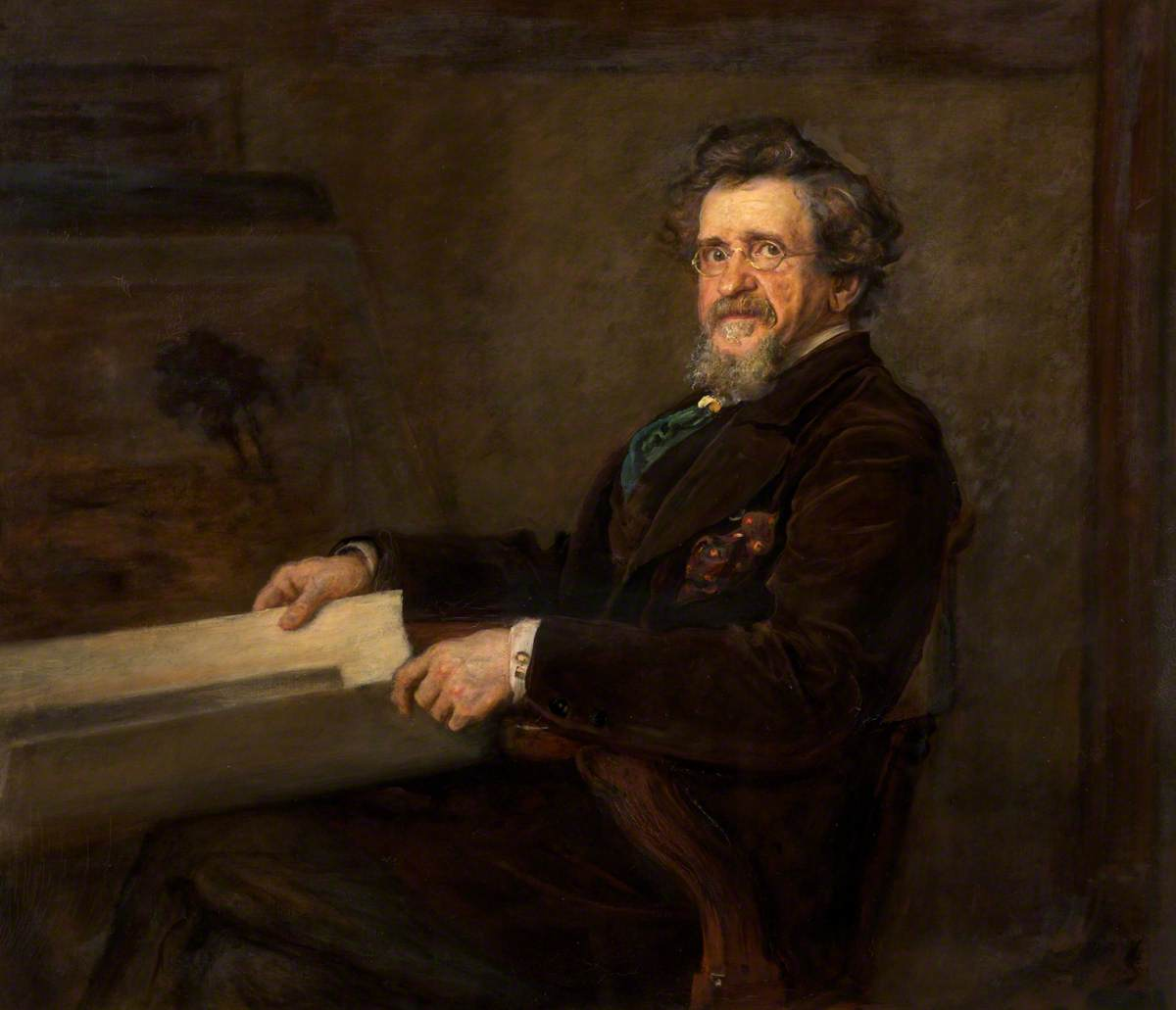
- Portrait of Thomas Oldham Barlow by John Everett Millais, 1886
- Born: 4 August 1824; Oldham
- Died: 24 December 1889 (aged 65); Kensington
- Resting place: Brompton cemetery
- Known for: mezzotint engraving

Thomas Oldham Barlow RA (4 August 1824 – 24 December 1889) was an English mezzotint engraver. His prints helped to popularise the works of painters like John Phillip and Sir John Everett Millais.

== Biography ==
Barlow was born in Oldham in Lancashire, the son of Henry Barlow, an ironmonger living in the High Street, and Sarah (née) Oldham. He was educated at the Old Grammar School, Oldham, and was then articled to "Stephenson & Royston", a firm of engravers in Manchester. He studied at the Manchester School of Design, where he won a prize of 10 guineas in 1846 for a drawing entitled Cullings from Nature.

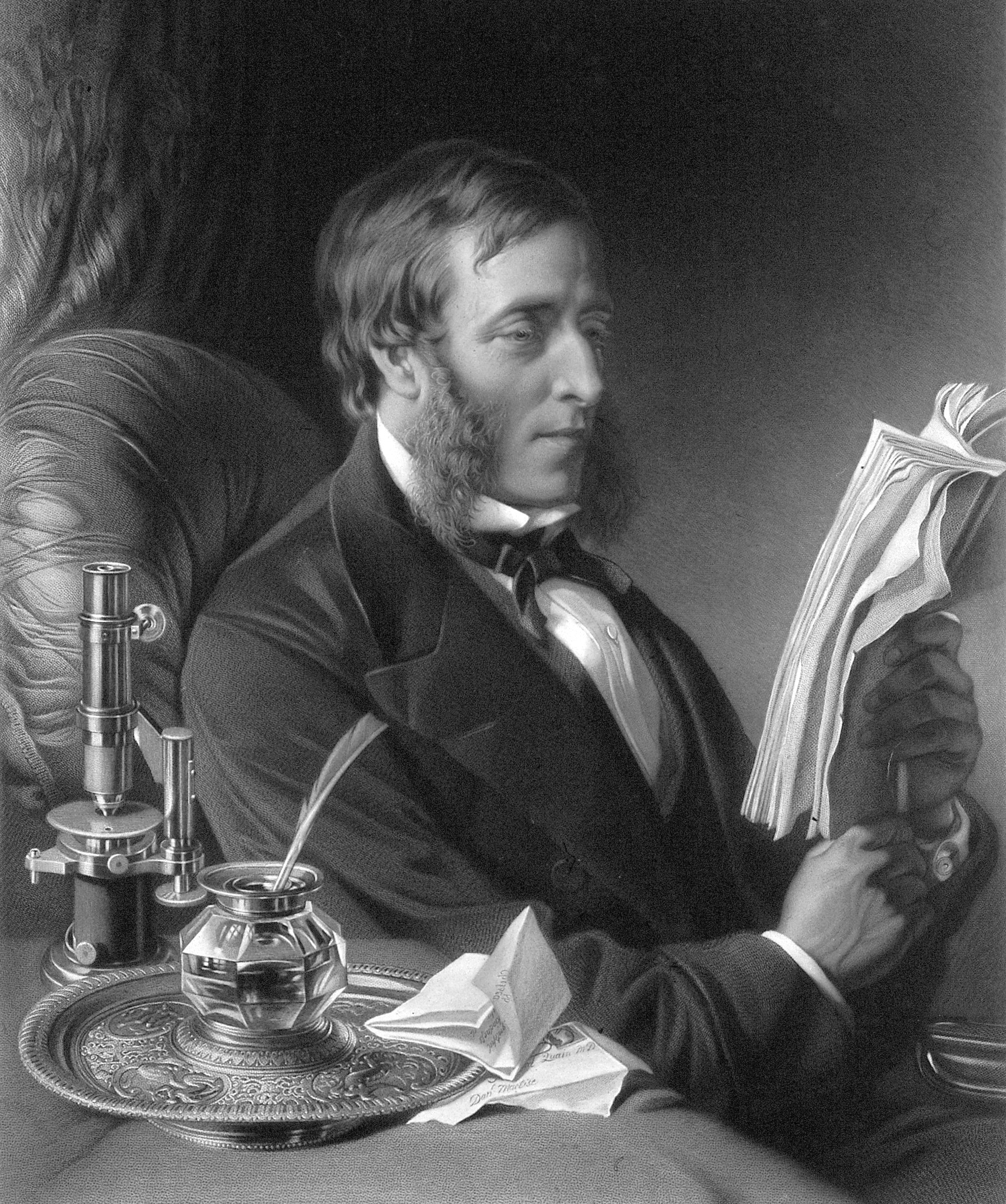
Portrait of Richard Quain (engraving after Daniel Maclise)

He moved to Ebury Street, London, in 1847. His first independent work was a line engraving of John Phillip's Courtship, made in 1848, and this led to a close friendship with the painter, the most important of whose pictures he subsequently engraved. These include Dona Pepita (1858); The Prison Window (1860); The House of Commons in 1860 (1866); Prayer in Spain (1873); Highland Breakfast (1877); and the celebrated La Gloria (1877). Barlow was the executor of Phillip's will, and drew up a catalogue of the collection of the artist's works which were shown at the Third Annual International Exhibition in London in 1873. / In 1856, Barlow engraved John Everett Millais's Huguenot, and in 1860 his My First Sermon, and during the latter part of his life was largely engaged upon that artist's works. Portraits of John Bright, Sir William Sterndale Bennett, Gladstone, Tennyson, Cardinal Newman, Lord Salisbury, and other public characters, painted by Millais for the art dealer "Agnew's", were all engraved by Barlow. Other well-known engravings include the Death of Chatterton (after Henry Wallis); portrait of Sir Isaac Newton (after Godfrey Kneller); portrait of Charles Dickens (after William Powell Frith); and several after Landseer, Maclise, Ansdell, and James Sant.

Barlow engraved Jl M. W. Turner's Wreck of the Minotaur for the Earl of Yarborough, who presented the plate to the Artists' General Benevolent Institution, and in 1856, for the same charity, he made a large etching of Turner's Vintage of Macon. Thirty years later he repeated the work in mezzotint, shortly before his death.

In 1858 Barlow founded the "Kensington Life Academy", an informal life-drawing club attended by a small but select group of artists, and which met at the studios of Richard Ansdell (hence the alternative name "Ansdell's"). Barlow was elected an associate engraver of the Royal Academy in 1873, a full associate in 1876, and an academician (RA) in 1881. He was a member and, for many years, secretary of The Etching Club.

Barlow died at his house, Auburn Lodge, in Victoria Road, Kensington, on 24 December 1889, and was buried in Brompton cemetery.

== Family ==
In 1851, he had married Ellen Cocks (5 March 1821 – 2 July 1908), daughter of James Cocks of Oldham, who survived him. They had two surviving daughters.

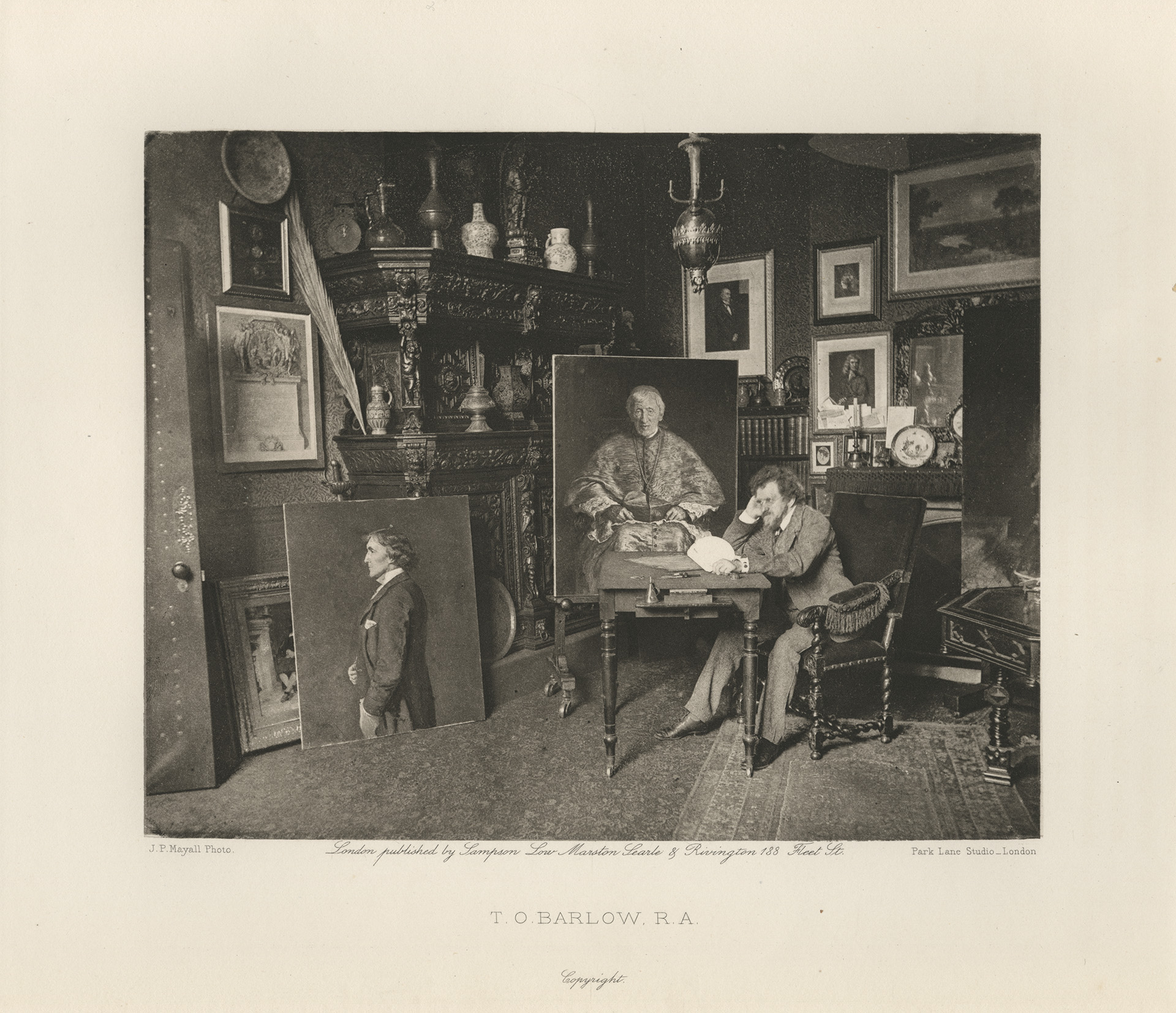
Barlow by J. P. Mayall from Artists at Home, published 1884, Department of Image Collections, National Gallery of Art Library, Washington, DC

Portraits of Barlow were painted by John Phillip in 1856, and by Millais in 1886, and he modelled for the figure of the sick ornithologist in the Millais picture, The Ruling Passion.
