= Hugh Millais =

British author & actor (1929-2009)

- Born: Hugh Geoffroy Millais; 23 December 1929; Blackwater Valley, Surrey, England
- Died: 4 July 2009 (aged 79); Kirtlington, Oxfordshire, England
- Other name: Hughie
- Citizenship: United Kingdom
- Education: Ampleforth College
- Occupations: Actor, author, journalist, yachtsman, property developer, interior designer, chef, bar owner, oil dealer, club entertainer
- Spouses: Eve Millais; Suzy Marthe Falconnet Millais (m. 1957–1974) Anne Sheffield Millais (m. 1988–2009)
- Children: 3
- Parents: Raoul Millais (father); Elinor Clare Macdonell (mother)
- Relatives: John Ryan (railway magnate) (great-grandfather)

Hugh Geoffroy Millais (23 December 1929 – 4 July 2009) was a British author and actor known for his film collaborations with director Robert Altman.

== Early years ==
Hugh Millais was the son of Raoul Millais (1901–1999) a painter-illustrator, and his first wife Elinor Clare Macdonell (died 1953), daughter of Canadian railway magnate Allan Ronald Macdonell and Helen Margaret Ryan. He was brought up Roman Catholic. As a child he lived in Blackwater Valley and Cork in Ireland. He was educated at Ampleforth.

== Culinary exploits ==
As for his cooking, there are many stories surrounding his culinary adventures. Millais made a meal for Orson Welles after the actor-director had hired his house in Andalusia, Spain for a year while filming, then left him stranded, penniless, in Naples. On another occasion, Rita Hayworth shed her lipstick in his onion soup. Once, Millais and Gary Cooper were said to have fled unwanted "friends" at a Paris party by hiding in a bathroom. Millais was once presented with a platter of seafood by Salvador Dalí served on the artist's naked wife, Gala. There was also an occasion where Millais shared Huevos Cubanos with Ernest Hemingway (whose chauffeur he apparently became for a while), Ava Gardner and Marlene Dietrich after sailing into a mini-revolution in pre-Castro Cuba and getting shot through the arm at the helm of his racing yacht, the Benbow. These and many other anecdotes are in Millais' cook-book "Hugh's Who: The Name-Dropper's Cookbook" which was published in 2007. A devoted falconer, he is said to have turned down a role in the film Shoot the Sun Down, in 1976, to go to Saudi Arabia, for a falconers' meet.

== Acting career ==
Millais' career as an actor came about by accident. Spotted in a bar at during the feria in Pamplona, he was invited to meet the director Robert Altman in England. Altman immediately hired him to play bounty hunter Dog Butler in McCabe & Mrs. Miller (1971), in which his character uses a single-shot elephant gun to shoot Warren Beatty's McCabe. During filming he adopted a phoney Texan accent, but Altman told him: “If I’d wanted an American heavy, I would have got Lee Marvin"; Millais' final voice track is spoken with a British accent. Altman then cast him to portray Susannah York's lecherous neighbour, Marcel, in the psychological thriller, Images (1972). In 1973 Millais took the lead role in Wolf Mankowitz's play The Samson Riddle, again with York at the Gate Theatre, Dublin. He portrayed Roy Endean in The Dogs of War (1980) and Uncle Martin, an 18th-century grandee in The Wicked Lady (1983), in which John Gielgud played his butler and Faye Dunaway his niece. He played the US Colonel in Chicago Joe and the Showgirl (1990), as well as appearing in British TV shows such as Deceptions, Ruth Rendell Mysteries, Kavanagh QC and Foreign Affairs.

== Personal life ==
Millais lived in Kirtlington, Oxfordshire until his death in July 2009. As Herbert Kretzmer put it, Hugh showed "wisdom and acquired magnificence by not doing any one thing for too long", while Robert Altman said: “As an actor, he is an excellent cook. As a cook, he’s a fantastic actor.”

He had three children from his second marriage to Suzy Marthe Falconnet Millais which ended in 1974. They are Ian Everett Millais, photographer Joshua Rengault Millais, and Tara Romany Maria Millais.

Millais married his third wife, Anne Sheffield, in Kensington & Chelsea, April 1988.

== Filmography ==
Year	Title	Role	Notes
1971	McCabe & Mrs. Miller	Butler	
1972	Images	Marcel	
1973	The Samson Riddle		(Play)
1980	The Dogs of War	Roy Endean	
1983	The Wicked Lady	Uncle Martin	
1985	Deceptions		TV movie
1990	Chicago Joe and the Showgirl	US colonel	
1990	Ruth Rendell Mysteries	Martin Silk	1 episode
1993	Foreign Affairs	Sir Thomas Fellowes	TV movie
1996	Kavanagh QC	Vice Admiral Kinross	1 episode, (final appearance)

== Bibliography ==
"Hugh's Who: The Name-dropper's Cookbook" (Park Press 2007)
