= John Clarke (British Army officer) =

Sir John Clarke KCB (1787–1854) was an Anglo-Irish officer in the British Army who became a General in the Spanish Army.

One of the sons of the Rev. Marshal Clarke, a Church of Ireland clergyman, by his marriage to Elizabeth Hare, Clarke was educated at Abbey School, Tipperary, in County Tipperary, Ireland. Joining the British Army, he was commissioned into the 45th Regiment and later served with the 5th Dragoon Guards. On active service in the Peninsular Wars, he was captured by the French but escaped. He became an Aide-de-Camp to General Ballain Dovis. He gained the rank of General in the Spanish Army and was appointed to an Order of knighthood by Charles III of Spain. After being appointed also a Knight Commander of the Order of the Bath he died in 1854 in Wales, unmarried.

He was a great-uncle of the explorer Thomas Alexander Barns.
