= The Ruling Passion =

Painting by John Everett Millais

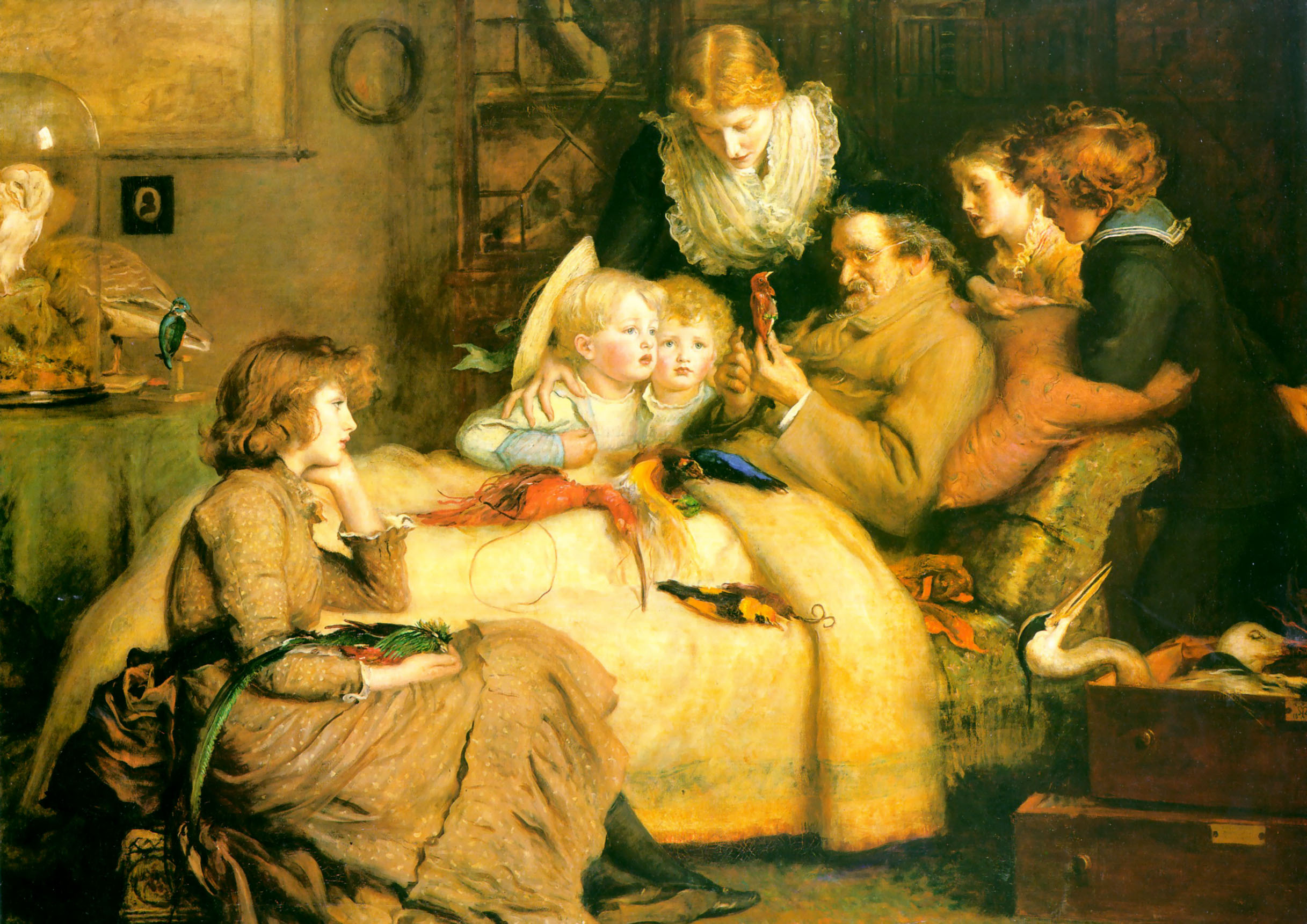
- Artist: John Everett Millais
- Year: 1885
- Medium: Oil on canvas
- Dimensions: 160.7 cm × 215.9 cm (63.3 in × 85.0 in)
- Location: Kelvingrove Art Gallery and Museum; Glasgow

The Ruling Passion, sometimes called The Ornithologist, is a painting by John Everett Millais which was shown at the Royal Academy Exhibition in 1885.

The painting depicts an older man lying on a chaise-longue. He is showing a stuffed bird, a king bird of paradise, to a group of children and a woman. The older girl on the left of the picture is holding a resplendent quetzal, and other specimens are scattered about. The attitude of the children ranges from the enthralled interest of the youngest two to the comparative indifference, almost boredom, of the oldest girl.

The work was inspired by a visit that Millais and his son John Guille Millais paid to the ornithologist John Gould shortly before his death in 1881. On the way home, Millais said to his son "That's a fine subject; a very fine subject. I shall paint it when I have time." It was several years after Gould's death before he had time, and the picture as painted is not a representation of Gould or of the scene during Millais' visit – the central figure was modelled by the engraver Thomas Oldham Barlow, a friend of the artist, two of the others are professional models, and the two smallest children are Millais' grandchildren (one of whom is William Milbourne James).

The painting was well received: the influential critic Ruskin said that it was one of "only three things worth looking at" in the R.A. exhibition.

== See also ==
- List of paintings by John Everett Millais
