= Wyke Castle =

UK listed building

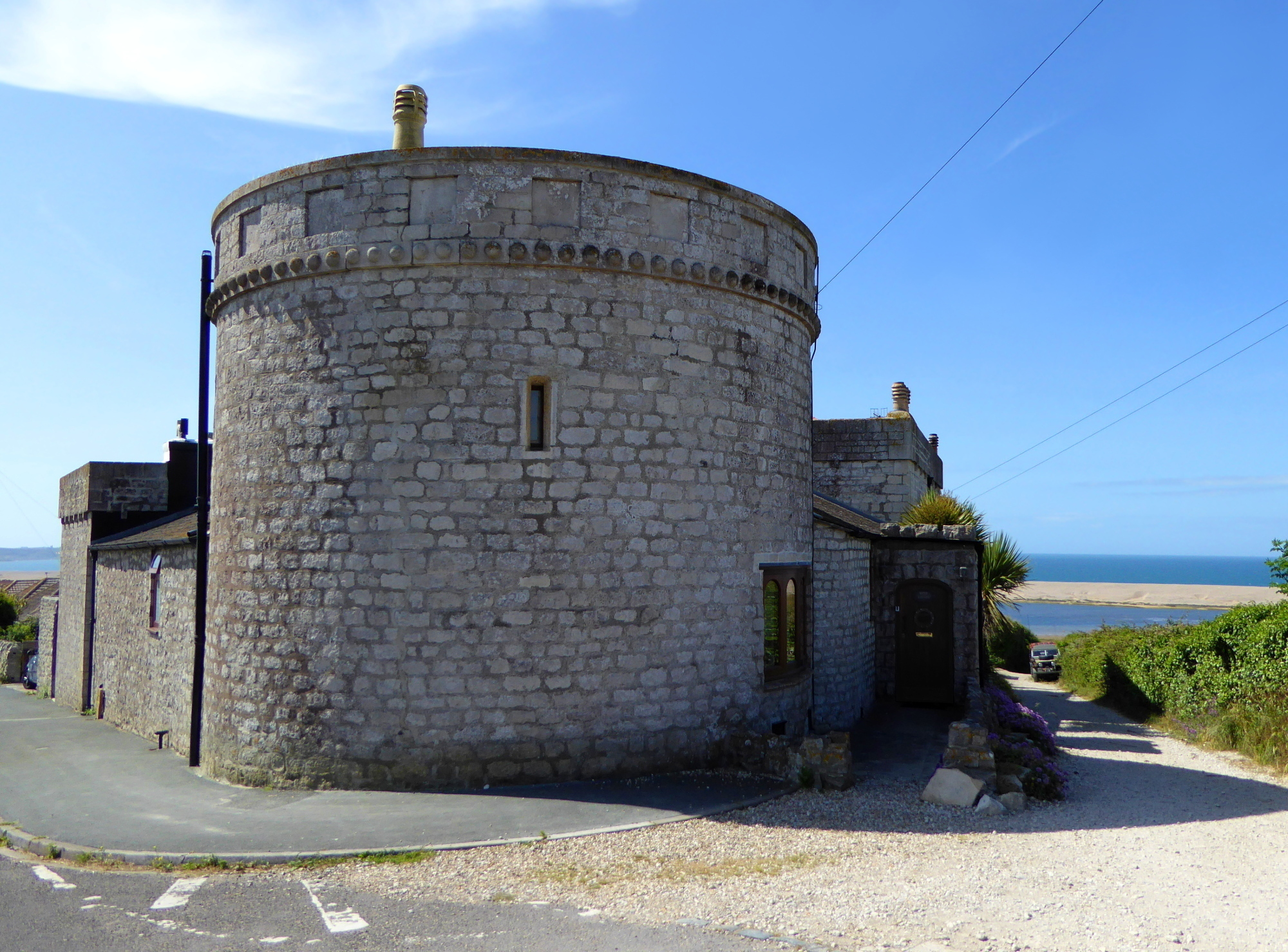
- Wyke Castle

- Location within Dorset

General information
- Location: Wyke Regis, England
- Coordinates: 50.5946°N 2.4813°W
- Completed: c. 1855
- Client: Andrew Chadwick Fenoulhet

Wyke Castle is a residence at the top of Pirates Lane, in Wyke Regis, near Weymouth, Dorset, England. It was built around 1855 and has been a Grade II listed building since 1974. It now forms three separate dwellings.

== History ==
Wyke Castle was built around 1855 as a residence for Dr. Andrew Chadwick Fenoulhet, a local surgeon who came to Weymouth in 1842. In 1855, he was elected by the Weymouth Union as the medical officer for the Wyke Regis district. He had previously served as the medical attendant for the Weymouth district from 1845 and as medical officer for a newly-established district covering part of Weymouth east of the town bridge from 1853.

After Fenoulhet's death in 1862, the castle remained in the ownership of his wife until her death in 1879. The castle was then sold to Mr. J. W. Davis. It was advertised as a "unique, pleasant, and very healthy Gentleman's Residence, standing in its own Grounds, with Gardens, Conservatories, &c."

In 1899, the castle was under the occupation of Mr. P. Cruttwell of Frome, who used it as a holiday resort. In the 1920s, the castle was occupied by Edmund Selous and his wife Fanny Margaret Maxwell. Selous, a naturalist, author and traveler, decorated the inside of the castle's tower with his collection of butterflies. During their time at the castle, Maxwell founded the local branch of the Women's Institute in 1923 and was its first president.

== Castle design ==
Wyke Castle is built of Portland stone rubble and ashlar, with slate and lead roofs. It is made up of a two-storey circular tower at its centre, with projecting low ranges leading to their own rectangular towers. The towers are ornamented with stone parapets, and the circular tower has a domed interior. The design of the castle was influenced by the Martello Tower.
