= Edmund Selous =

British ornithologist and writer

- Born: 14 August 1857; Regent's Park, London, England
- Died: 25 March 1934 (aged 76); Dorset, England
- Occupations: ornithologist; writer
- Relatives: Frederick Selous (brother)

Edmund Selous (14 August 1857 – 25 March 1934) was a British ornithologist and writer. He was the younger brother of big-game hunter Frederick Selous. Born in London, the son of a wealthy stockbroker, Selous was educated privately and matriculated at Pembroke College, Cambridge in September 1877. He left without a degree and was admitted to the Middle Temple just over a year later and was called to the bar in 1881. He practised as a barrister only briefly before retiring to pursue the study of natural history and literature.

Edmund married Fanny Margaret Maxwell (1863-1955) on 13 January 1886. Fanny was the eldest daughter of the novelist Mary Elizabeth Braddon (1835-1915) and publisher John Maxwell (1824-1895).

In 1888 they moved to Wiesbaden, German Empire and then to Mildenhall in Suffolk in 1889. In the 1920s, they moved to the Weymouth village Wyke Regis in Dorset, where they lived in Wyke Castle.

== Career ==
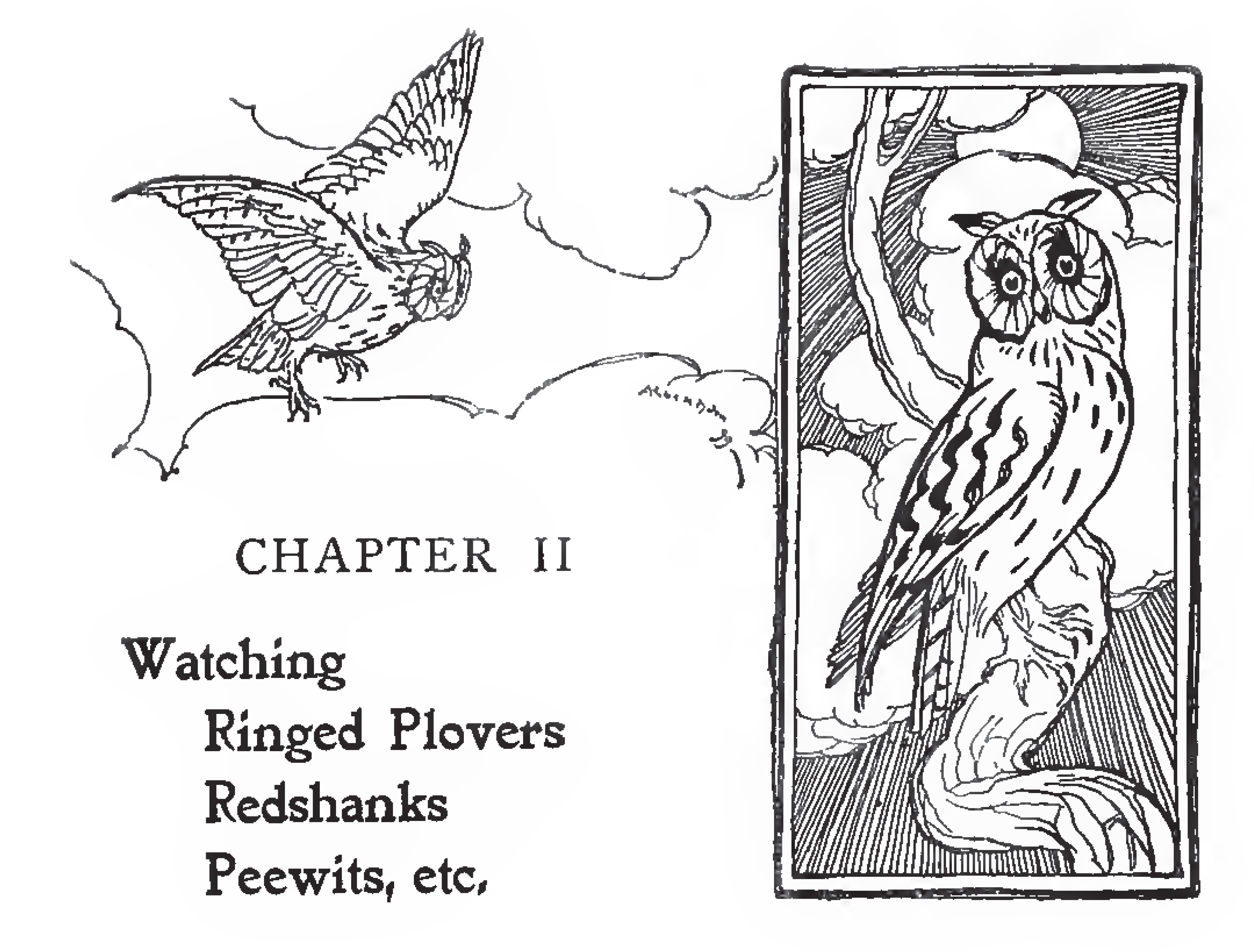
Illustration by Joseph Smit of owls in Edmund Selous's Bird Watching (1901)

Selous started as a conventional naturalist, but developed a hatred of the killing of animals for scientific study and was a pioneer of bird-watching as a method of scientific study. He was a strong proponent of non-destructive bird-study as opposed to the collection of skins and eggs. In his book Bird Watching (Selous, 1901) he said:

For myself, I must confess that I once belonged to this great, poor army of killers, though happily, a bad shot, a most fatigable collector, and a poor half-hearted bungler, generally. But now that I have watched birds closely, the killing of them seems to me as something monstrous and horrible; and, for every one that I have shot, or even only shot at and missed, I hate myself with an increasing hatred. I am convinced that this most excellent result might be arrived at by numbers and numbers of others, if they would only begin to do the same; for the pleasure that belongs to observation and inference is, really, far greater than that which attends any kind of skill or dexterity, even when death and pain add their zest to the latter. Let anyone who has an eye and a brain (but especially the latter), lay down the gun and take up the glasses for a week, a day, even for an hour, if he is lucky, and he will never wish to change back again. He will soon come to regard the killing of birds as not only brutal, but dreadfully silly, and his gun and cartridges, once so dear, will be to him, hereafter, as the toys of childhood are to the grown man.

The shooting of birds for so called scientific purposes, like building museum collections, he strongly rejected.

He was a solitary man and was not well known in ornithological circles. He avoided both the company of ornithologists and reading their observations so as to base his conclusions entirely on his own observations. He believed that every observed detail should be published and produced a number of ornithological books and papers as well as several other books on popular natural history and a natural history series for children.

Selous published a variety of books on natural history, especially birds, ranging from children's books to more serious ornithological works. He travelled to southern Africa and India in his youth and later to Shetland, Sweden, the Netherlands, and Iceland to observe birds there. He had a particular interest in bird behaviour, sexual selection and the problem of the coordinated flight manoeuvres of swarming of birds, which he sought to explain through the idea of thought-transference. He continued bird-watching and writing until near the end of his life.

Selous was not an opponent of zoos but campaigned for their reform including more spacious accommodation. In 1901, he authored a series of articles for the Saturday Review which were reprinted by the Humanitarian League as a pamphlet, "The Old Zoo and the New".

== Bibliography ==
Books by Selous include:

- Tommy Smith's Animals. London: Methuen. 1899.
- Beautiful Birds. London: Dent. 1901.
- Bird Watching . London: Dent. 1901 – via Wikisource.
- Bird Life Glimpses. George Allen. 1905a. (illustrations by George Edward Lodge)
- The Bird Watcher in the Shetlands. With some notes on seals – and digressions . London: Dent. 1905b – via Wikisource.
- The Romance of the Animal World – Interesting Descriptions of the Strange and Curious in the Natural History. London: Seeley & Co. 1905c.
- The Romance of Insect Life – Interesting Descriptions of the Strange and Curious in the Insect World. London: Seeley & Co. 1906.
- Tommy Smith's Other Animals. London: Methuen. 1906.
- Jacks's Insects. London: Methuen. 1910.
- The Zoo Conversation Book. London: Mills & Boon. 1911.
- The Zoo Conversation Book. London: Hughie's Second Visit. Mills & Boon. 1912.
- The Wonders of the Insect World. London: Seeley, Service. 1914.
- The Wonders of Animal Life. London: Seeley, Service. 1916.
- Tommy Smith at the Zoo. London: Methuen. 1919.
- Jacks's Other Insects. London: Methuen. 1920.
- The Wonders of Animal Life. London: Seeley, Service. 1921.
- Tommy Smith's Birds. London: Methuen. 1922.
- Realities of Bird Life. Being extracts from the diaries of a life-loving naturalist. London: Constable & Co. 1927.
- Thought-transference (or what?) in birds. London: Constable & Co. 1931.
- Evolution of Habit in Birds. London: Constable & Co. 1933.

Selous also wrote several articles in journals:

- An Observational Diary of the Habits of Nightjars (Caprimulgus europæus), Mostly of a Sitting Pair. Notes Taken at Time and on Spot . The Zoologist, 4th series, vol. 3, issue 699 (September, 1899), pp. 388–402 and issue 701 (November, 1899), pp. 486–505. 1899 – via Wikisource.
- An Observational Diary of the Habits of the Great Plover (Œdicnemus crepitans) during September and October . The Zoologist, 4th series, vol. 4, issue 706 (April, 1900), pp. 173–185, issue 708 (June, 1900), pp. 270–277, and issue 712 (October, 1900), pp. 458–476. 1900 – via Wikisource.
- An Observational Diary of the Habits, Mostly Domestic, of the Great Crested Grebe and of the Peewit . The Zoologist, 4th series, vol. 5, issue 719 (May, 1901), pp. 161–183, issue 723 (September, 1901), pp. 339–350, issue 726 (December, 1901), pp. 454–462, issue 730 (April, 1902), pp. 133–144. 1901 – via Wikisource.
