= Blackwater Valley =

Nature reserve in southern England

- Site of Special Scientific Interest
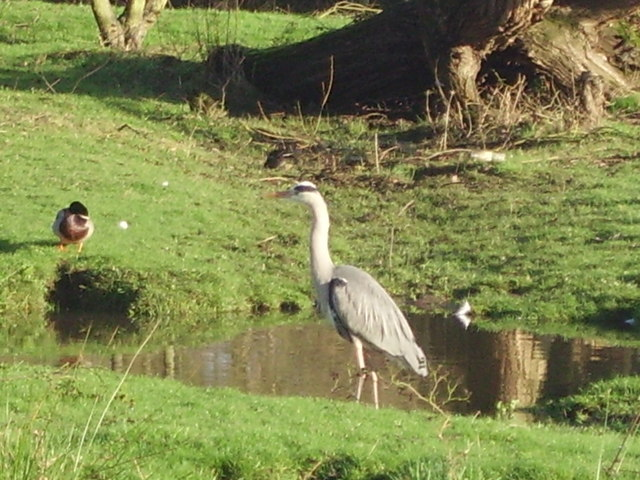

- Location within Berkshire
- Location of Blackwater Valley.
- Area of search: Berkshire; Hampshire
- Grid reference: SU 847 605
- Coordinates: 51.337°N 0.785°W
- Interest: Biological
- Area: 33.9 hectares (84 acres)
- Notification date: 1992
- Location map: Magic Map

Blackwater Valley is a 33.9-hectare (84-acre) biological Site of Special Scientific Interest between Sandhurst in Berkshire and Blackwater in Hampshire.

The River Blackwater runs through the site, which also has wet valley alder wood, swamp and alluvial meadows. The meadows have several species of flora associated with ancient grassland and they are a nationally rare and threatened habitat. An area of deciduous woodland has the rare sedge, Carex elongata.

The Blackwater Valley Path runs through the site and part of it is the Shepherd Meadows nature reserve, which is open to the public.
