= Abel Chapman =

English naturalist (1851–1929)

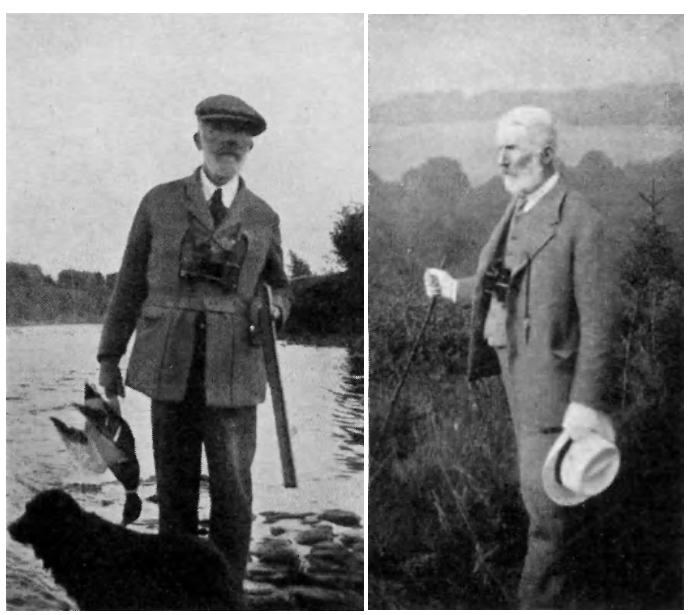
- Born: 4 October 1851; Bishopwearmouth, England
- Died: 23 January 1929 (aged 77) "Houxty", Wark on Tyne, Northumberland, England

Abel Chapman (4 October 1851 – 23 January 1929) was an English artist, hunter-naturalist and travel writer. He contributed in saving the Spanish ibex from extinction and helped in the establishment of South Africa's first game reserve. He published several popular travelogues which made use of his illustrations and photographs.

== Early life ==
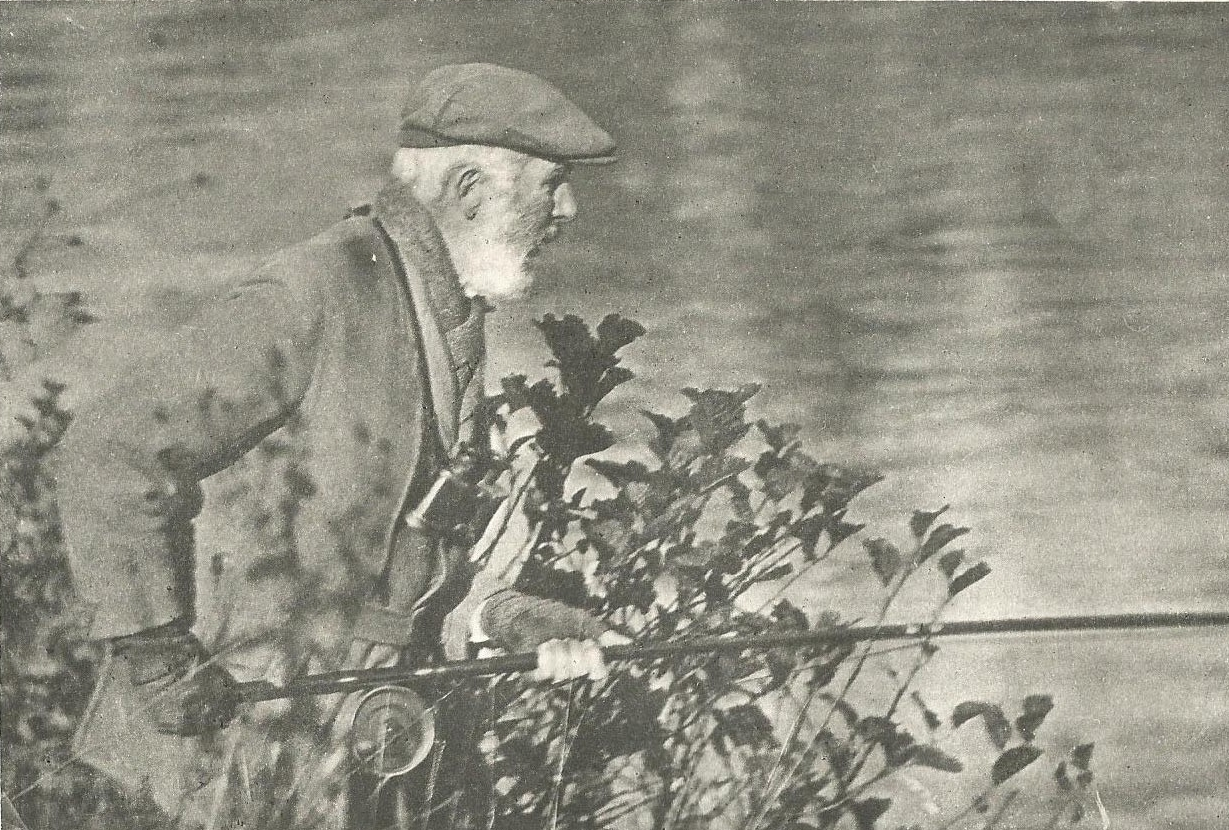
Chapman fishing in his later years

Chapman was born at 212 High Street, Bishopwearmouth, part of central Sunderland, on 4 October 1851. He was the eldest child of Thomas Edward and Jane Ann (née Crawhall) Chapman, and came from a long line of sportsmen who were both accomplished hunters and acclaimed naturalists.

His maternal grandfather, Joseph Crawhall, was an accurate grouse shot in Hexhamshire, as well as being a founder member of the National History Society of Northumbria. His maternal uncle, George Crawhall, was described by Chapman as "a typical sportsman of the old school – the mentor to whom I owe the best grounding in field-craft."

Chapman's first experiences of hunting were in Northumberland, where he fell in love with nature at the same time as shooting. He often made drawings of the birds he saw and shot there. But it was a friend he made at Rugby School (1864-1869), F. C. Selous, who inspired his lifelong love of travel and adventure – a world away from the moors of Northumberland. Years later, he co-authored a hunting book with Selous and another friend, John Guille Millais, called The Big Game of Africa and Europe.

== Adventures and expeditions ==
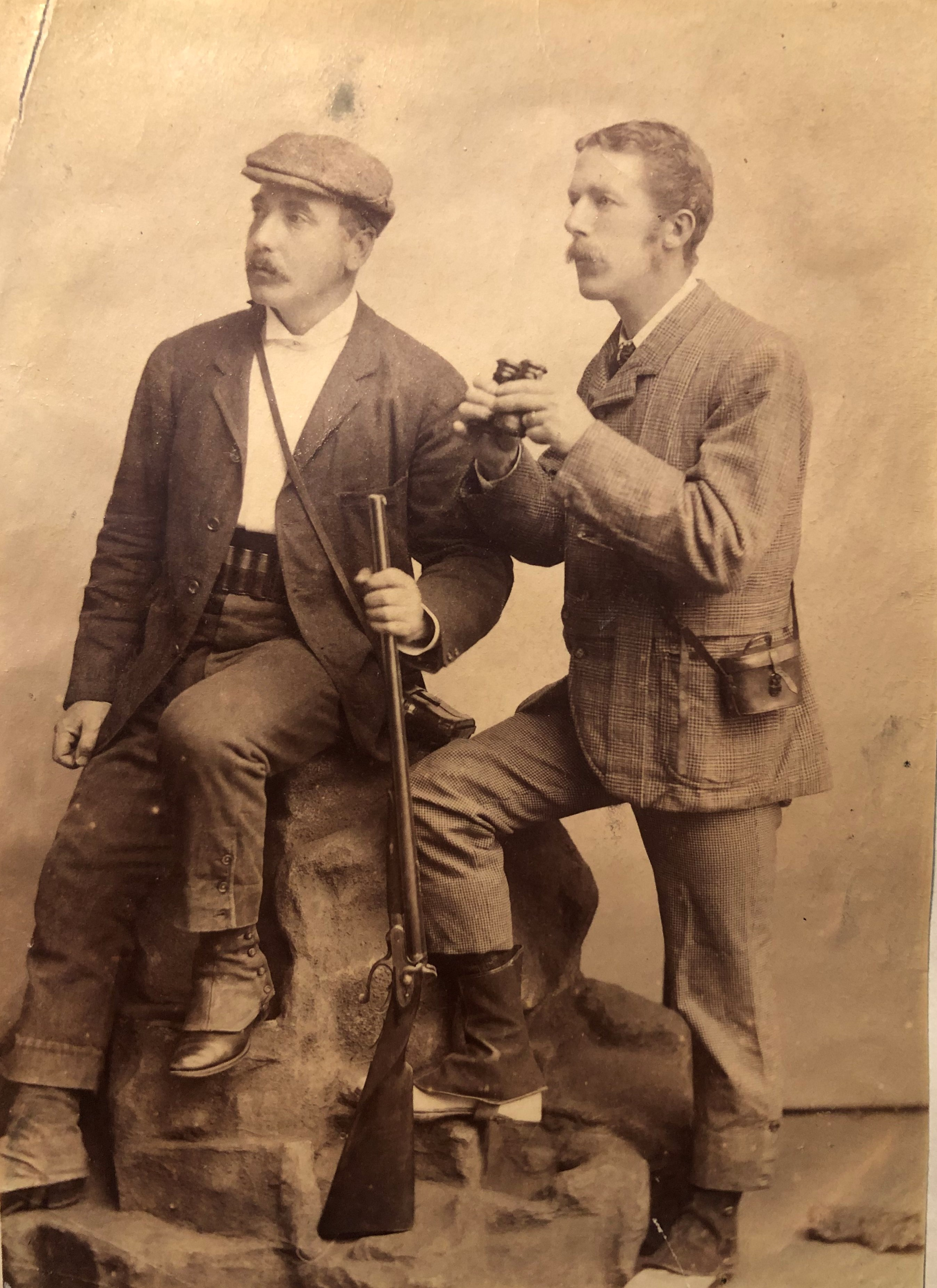
Buck and Chapman

Chapman initially joined his father's firm in Sunderland after leaving Rugby. On his father's death in 1875, he took over the family brewing and wine business of T. E. Chapman and son. The family also owned the Lambton Brewery in Sunderland. He was a partner and sold off the enterprise in 1897.

Chapman travelled to Portugal, Spain and Morocco as part of his work in the wine trade. The visits were not confined just to work, however, as they allowed him to broaden his knowledge of wildlife by fishing and shooting. In the summer of 1881 he travelled to Norway for the first time (including a brief visit to Spitsbergen), fishing and hunting in that country as well. In Spain he made friends with Walter J. Buck, British vice consul at Jerez. The pair became joint managers of a 40-mile (64 km) stretch of coast at Coto Donana, near the river Guadalquivir, in 1882, which they ran as a nature reserve. It was here Chapman became the first naturalist to see Europe's major breeding ground for flamingos; and where he helped save the Spanish ibex, a species of wild goat, from extinction.

He was also involved in hunting and angling when at home, writing about wildfowl and fishing in Northumberland. His first books were Bird-Life of the Borders (1889) and First Lessons in the Art of Wildfowling (1896).

He later visited Canada and was a frequent visitor to Norway (making 46 trips in all to Scandinavia, including twice to Sweden and twice to Denmark, in 1889 and 1893). One of his five brothers, Alfred Crawhall Chapman, often accompanied him, and detailed accounts of their adventures were compiled in a book Wild Norway (1897). In 1899 he visited Africa with his brother Walter Ingram Chapman. This and subsequent African trips resulted in On Safari (1908) and Savage Sudan (1921).

Trophies from his hunting trips adorned the walls of his home Silksworth Hall in the late 19th century. He was a member of the Shikar Club, along with his friend John Guille Millais.

Today his stuffed animals can be seen on display at Sunderland Museum and Winter Gardens, the National History Museum in London and the Great North Museum in Newcastle.

Along with Walter Buck, he was involved in support for the establishment of the Coto Doñana nature reserve in southern Spain. This area helped save the Spanish ibex. There are now 35,000 ibex, thanks to hunting restrictions initiated by Chapman. He also co-authored two books with Buck about hunting and fishing at the site, Wild Spain in 1893 and Unexplored Spain in 1910. He wrote about his Spanish adventures again in The Big Game of Africa and Europe (1914).

== Retirement ==
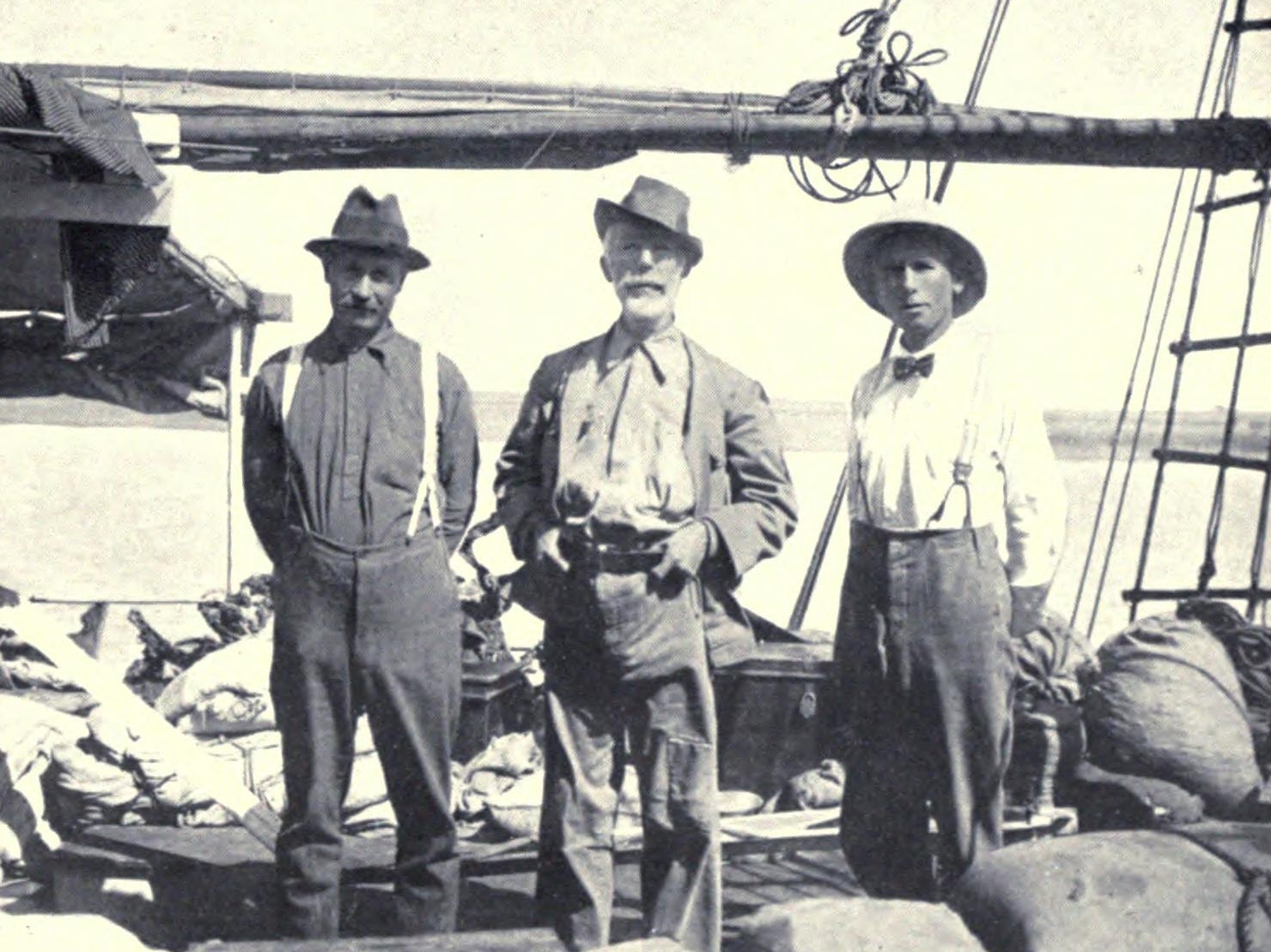
Willoughby Prescott Lowe, Chapman and Hubert Lynes, 1913-14

Chapman retired from the family firm in 1897 following its takeover by J W Cameron, and the following year he purchased and moved to "Houxty", a farm located on the North Tyne near the village of Wark on Tyne in Northumberland, where he created his own little nature reserve. His smart country home was surrounded by small plantations, moorland and gardens, all designed to attract birds, animals and other naturalists in profusion. Campers at the first Baden-Powell holiday camp in 1908 visited Houxty while staying six miles away in Humshaugh.

Chapman and Buck visited South Africa for the first time in 1899, to take part in big-game hunting. The trip, cut short by the Boer War, proved disappointing, as the Transvaal border (now the Kruger area) was over-hunted. After returning to Britain, Chapman drew up plans to protect the Kruger site from further harm by creating a nature reserve. His proposals were sent to the International Convention for the Preservation of Wild Animals in London in 1900 and, shortly after, the Sabi Game Reserve was established. Over 2,500 square kilometres of land were set aside for the project, and former intelligence officer James Stevenson-Hamilton was appointed as the first warden. By 1903 the park was such a success that it was extended, and a second reserve – the Shingwedzi – was opened nearby later that year. Today, the Sabi Reserve, a core part of the Kruger National Park, is a tourist hot spot.

Chapman was appointed as a magistrate, acting in that capacity for the first time in June 1916 during a Court of Petty sessions in the village of Bellingham.

Chapman was a member of the Society for the Preservation of the Wild Fauna of the Empire. In 1922 he was awarded an honorary degree by the University of Durham. In 1928 he wrote about his life in Retrospect. Chapman died at Houxty on 23 January 1929.

== Bibliography ==
- Chapman (1889). Bird-Life of the Borders: Records of Wild Sport and Natural History on Moorland and Sea. London: Gurney and Jackson.
- Chapman (1896). First Lessons in the Art of Wildfowling. London: Horace Cox
- Chapman (1897). Wild Norway: With Chapters on Spitsbergen, Denmark, Etc. London: Edward Arnold.
- Chapman and Walter J. Buck (1893). Wild Spain (España Agresta): Records of Sport With Rifle, Rod, and Gun; Natural History and Exploration. London: Gurney and Jackson.
- Chapman (1908) On Safari: Big Game Hunting in British East Africa; With Studies in Bird-Life. London: Edward Arnold.
- Chapman and Walter J. Buck (1910). Unexplored Spain. London: Edward Arnold.
- Chapman; Frederick Courteney Selous; John Guille Millais (1914). The Big Game of Africa and Europe. The Gun at Home and Abroad. Vol. III. London: The London & Counties Press Association.
- Chapman (1921). Savage Sudan, Its Wild Tribes, Big Game and Bird-Life. London: Gurney and Jackson.
- Chapman (1924). The Borders and beyond: Arctic...Cheviot...Tropic. London: Gurney and Jackson.
- Chapman (1928). Retrospect: Reminiscences and Impressions of a Hunter-Naturalist in Three Continents 1851-1928. London: Gurney and Jackson.
- Chapman and George Bolam (1930). Memories of Fourscore Years Less Two, 1851-1929. London: Gurney and Jackson. Published posthumously.
