= John Guille Millais =

English nature artist and writer (1865–1931)

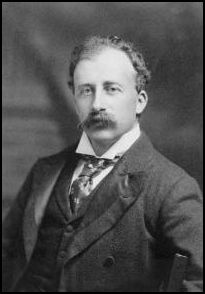
- Johnny Millais c. 1900
- Born: 24 March 1865; Perth, Perthshire, Scotland
- Died: 24 March 1931 (aged 66); Horsham, West Sussex, England
- Known for: Painting, sculpture, ornithology, gardening
- Notable work: Natural History of British Feeding Ducks; Mammals of Great Britain and Northern Ireland; Biography of John Everett Millais.
- Spouse: Frances Margaret Skipworth
- Children: 4, including Raoul
- Parents: John Everett Millais (father); Effie Gray (mother)
- Awards: Fellow of the Zoological Society of London (FZS)

John Guille Millais (/ˈmɪleɪ/ MIL-ay, also US: /mɪˈleɪ/ mil-AY; 24 March 1865 – 24 March 1931) was a British artist, naturalist, gardener and travel writer who specialised in wildlife and flower portraiture. He travelled extensively around the world in the late Victorian period detailing wildlife often for the first time. He is noted for illustrations that are of a particularly exact nature.

== Early life ==
John Guille Millais was the fourth son and seventh child of Sir John Everett Millais, the Pre-Raphaelite Brotherhood painter, and his wife Effie Gray. John was raised in London and Perthshire with a wide interest in natural history, which embraced horticulture, hunting including big game hunting and wildfowl. As a boy he made a collection of birds shot around the coast of Scotland later recounted in his book "The Wildfowler in Scotland". This formed the basis of a lifetime collection of around 3,000 specimens that he later housed in a private museum in Horsham in West Sussex, England. Specimens from this collection were depicted by his father in his painting The Ruling Passion (also known as The Ornithologist). John Guille himself painted a bird in his father's painting Dew-Drenched Furze.

== Working life ==
Millais began his career in the army with the Seaforth Highlanders, but after six years he resigned to travel the world. His was clearly a wanderlust based on a desire to see, record and paint the natural world. To this end he travelled widely in Europe, Africa and North America. In the New World in the 1880s/90s he explored Canada and Newfoundland and helped map uncharted areas of Alaska.

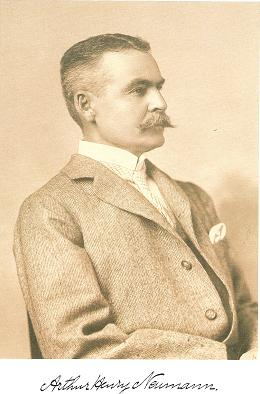
Arthur Neumann (1897)

In 1903 Millais co-founded the Society for the Preservation of the Wild Fauna of the Empire (SPWFE). Clearly a clubbable and convivial man in 1909 Millais was a founder member of the Shikar Club, a sportsclub where like-minded associates could dine and discuss their passion for hunting, especially big game hunting. Millais was passionate about hunting and fellow members included the famous hunters Frederick Selous (the brother of ornithologist Edmund Selous) and explorer and hunter Frank Wallace. The club still survives and included Prince Philip, Duke of Edinburgh amongst its members until his death in 2021.

After World War I broke out in 1914, Millais was taken into the secret service of the Royal Navy in Norway and in Iceland. As he later explained in his autobiographical book Wanderings and Memories, he was involved in counter-espionage, provided with the rank of Lieutenant-Commander and was appointed British Vice-Counsul at Hammerfest in northern Norway where he stayed until 1917. In August 1915 he met with two German spies at Christiania, and travelled with them to Lofoten. He was engaged in setting up and supporting a network of counter espionage. The importance of Norway to the war effort was that the northern seas provided a route for food and materials to reach British ports. Millais reported from Norway that whilst the Norwegian authorities were generally pro British, much of the population were pro German. In December 1917 he was nearly captured by the Germans but with the help of a harbour master he managed to get out of Norway, returning to Newcastle.

After the War, Millais wrote and published a book on his life and hunting exploits in Africa and Scotland. Wanderings and Memories chronicled his passion for big game hunting and his fondness for the Scotland of his childhood. It contains a chapter from Millais' close friend, African game hunter Arthur Henry Neumann. This book went to several reprints including an American edition renamed A Sportsman's Wanderings. In 1921 he travelled with his son Raoul Millais to the southern Sudan and mapped for the first time large areas of Bahr al Ghazal, an exploit which led to a book on the Upper Nile, Far Away Up The Nile, published in 1924.

== Artistic career ==
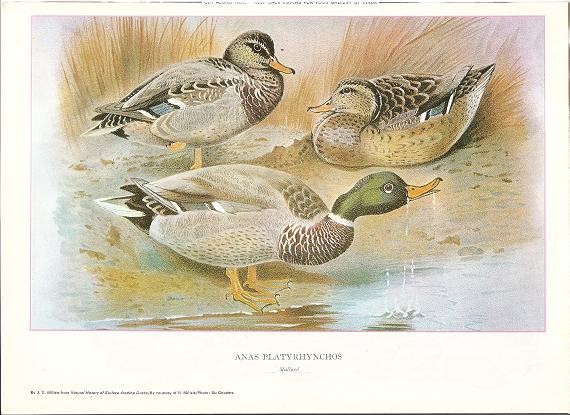
Mallard from British Surface Feeding Ducks by J G Millais

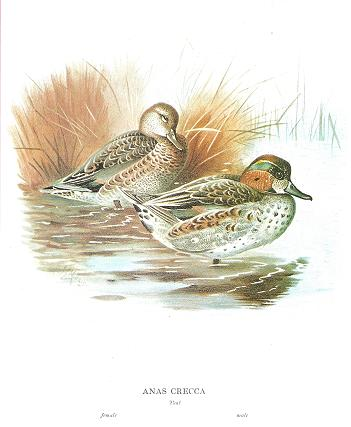
Teal from British Surface Feeding Ducks by J G Millais

Millais is one of the most respected of British ornithologists and bird artists, producing between 1890 and 1914 a series of books on birds and other natural history subjects. In the study of ornithology he was renowned for his portraiture of wildfowl and game birds, the subjects of his three most famous works: Natural History of British Feeding Ducks; British Diving Ducks and British Game Birds. They rank amongst the finest work on wildfowl ever published. Each bird receives individual treatment in text and detailed chromolithographs, some of which are by his friend and pre-eminent bird artist of the day Archibald Thorburn (1860–1935). Each species is represented by two or three individuals on a plate drawn in attitudes of feeding, resting and courtship.

The books are lavish and with just 400 to 600 original editions published are now prized as examples of a certain type of High Victorian grandeur. Millais' skills are essentially Victorian, as private wealth allowed him to indulge his passions on a grand scale. He was undoubtedly tenacious. His son Raoul spoke of him as an "astonishing man and his power of concentration was such that once he took up a subject he never left it until he knew more about it than anyone in the World"

This tenacity to get a job done to the best of abilities was well-illustrated in his preparations for Mammals of Great Britain and Ireland (1904) where he spent months with the whaling fleet in the Atlantic to study first hand a group of mammals that had hitherto received little attention. The work which appeared in a limited print run in 1904 also contains illustrations and chromolithographs by George Edward Lodge (1860–1954) and Archibald Thorburn.

In 1917 Millais published the first of two volumes on rhododendrons and their various hybrids. The edition was limited to 550 copies with 17 full colour plates of gardens and plants at his home, Compton Brow in Horsham. In the preface Millais explains that he began cultivating rhododendrons under the tutelage of his neighbour the naturalist and botanist Sir Edmund Loder

Millais wrote biographies of his father, John Everett Millais, and Frederick Courtney Selous. In addition he became an authority on rhododendrons, azaleas and magnolias and exhibited as a sculptor of birds including one of fighting game birds; the sculpture is now owned by the Horsham Museum.

== Family life in Sussex ==
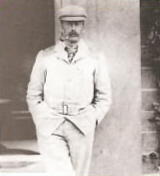
Johnny Millais c 1907

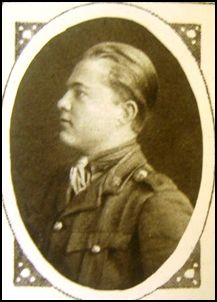
Major Geoffroy De Carteret Millais died of wounds in France on 21 August 1918

Millais married Frances "Fanny" Margaret Skipworth, daughter of a Lincolnshire landowner. He settled his family at Horsham in West Sussex. Their first child, Daphne, was born in 1895 (died of appendicitis in 1904). Geoffroy "George" was born in 1896 (killed in action, August 1918). Raoul was born in 1901; he became a noted artist in his own right. Rosamond (or Rosamund) was born in 1904. In 1900 Millais arranged for the building of a house called Compton's Brow in Horsham from where he created a private museum consisting of 14,000 specimens. The collection assembled at Horsham reflected his broad interests and included specimens of big game, deer, waterfowl, bats, seals. The collection even included a whole grizzly bear and a Tay salmon weighing 50 lb. He continually created illustrations and painted his wildlife collection. Millais would regularly take off for months at a time to go hunting and to travel, bringing back numerous specimens to add to his vast collection. This continued until well into the 1920s. When in Horsham he entertained widely and enthusiastically. Hilaire Belloc would come to dinner once a month and would sit up to the early hours of the morning drinking large amounts of beer as the non-imbibing Millais listened to his extravagant tales.

At Horsham Millais created a garden remembered for its beauty. He cultivated a number of new rhododendrons, including one that he named after his wife Fanny and his daughter Rosamond. In 1917 he published the first of two volumes Rhododendrons and Their Various Hybrids, incorporating advice on propagation from his friend and fellow naturalist, Sir Edmund Loder. In 1923 Millais was awarded the Loder Rhododendron Cup, followed in 1927 by the Victoria Medal of Honour by the Royal Horticultural Society. In 1927 Millais published his last great work Magnolias.

His son Raoul recalled a chaotic busy house and a father who was 'enormously intelligent, with the energy of a racing car, a workaholic with immense enthusiasm and a keen sense of the ridiculous' The house and garden did not survive his death, but a few smaller notable plants were saved, some of which were replanted in the Windsor Great Park by his nephew Edward Gray Millais (1918-2003), a leading rhododendron and azalea propagation specialist. The vast collection of animal and bird skins was dispersed and sold. The local Horsham Museum retains a number of skins and sculptures.

Millais had the ability to convey the subtlety of the natural world with an artistic skill that marks him out as a great bird artist in particular. His gift was to communicate his love and respect for the natural world. Millais died at Horsham on his sixty-sixth birthday.

== Bibliography (United Kingdom) ==
- Game Birds and Shooting Sketches (frontispiece by John Everett Millais), Henry Sotheran, 1892
- A Breath From The Veldt (frontispiece by John Everett Millais), Henry Sotheran, 1895 2nd ed 1899
- British Deer and Their Horns, Longmans, 1897
- The Life and Letters of Sir John Everett Millais, Methuen 1899, abridged 1905
- The Wildfowler in Scotland, Longmans, 1901
- The Natural History of British Surface-Feeding Ducks, Longmans, 1902
- The Mammals of Great Britain and Ireland, (three volumes) Longmans, 1904/5/6
- Newfoundland and Its Untrodden Ways, Longmans, 1907
- The Natural History of British Game Birds, Longmans, 1909
- British Diving Ducks, Longmans, 1913
- Deer and Deer Stalking, Longmans, 1913
- Rhododendrons and Their Various Hybrids, Longmans, 1917
- The Life of Frederick Courteney Selous D.S.O., Longmans, 1918
- Wanderings and Memories, Longmans, 1919
- Rhododendrons (second series), Longmans, 1924
- Far Away Up The Nile, Longmans, 1924
- Magnolias, Longmans, 1927
