= Raoul Millais =

English painter

- Raoul Millais portrait taken in London, 1926
- Born: 4 October 1901; Horsham, West Sussex, England
- Died: 24 November 1999 (aged 98); Oxfordshire, England
- Known for: Painting, Illustration,
- Notable work: Black and White Stallions Fighting, Wild Horses, Summer Morning, Greyskin
- Movement: Sporting artist, equestrian artist
- Spouse(s): Elinor Clare Macdonell (d. 1953); Kay Prior Palmer
- Children: 3, including Hugh
- Parent(s): John Guille Millais; Frances Margaret Skipworth

Hesketh Raoul Lejarderay Millais (4 October 1901 – 24 November 1999), usually known as Raoul or 'Liony' Millais, was a portrait painter, equestrian artist and sportsman.

== Family background ==
Millais was the grandson of the Pre-Raphaelite painter Sir John Everett Millais and the son of naturalist John Guille Millais, from whom he inherited both his artistic talent and his love of animals and of hunting.

== Artistic career ==
Millais is best known for his equestrian paintings and for his Spanish work, created when he accompanied Ernest Hemingway. Like his contemporary, Alfred Munnings, Millais was an opponent of Modernism in art, which he called "the Picasso lark".

Numerous painted works by Millais have been sold at auction at Christie's, and Bonhams in London. His oeuvre has been posthumously profiled in publications such as Artnet, The Independent, The Field, and Art UK.

== Personal life ==
He married Elinor Clare Macdonell, daughter of railway magnate Allan Ronald Macdonell and Helen Margaret Ryan (heir and niece of Hugh Ryan), of Montreal, Canada. Elinor was also the granddaughter of Irish-Canadian industrialist John Ryan, one of the wealthiest men in Canada at the time of his death in 1902. Millais and Elinor had two sons, John Millais (b. 1927) and Hugh Geoffroy Millais (b.1929) a celebrated actor.

After Elinor's death in 1953, Millais married his second wife Kay Prior Palmer with whom he had a third son, Hesketh Merlin.

He died in 1999 aged 98 in Oxfordshire, England.

== Biography ==
- Duff Hart-Davis, Raoul Millais: his life and work (1998) ISBN 1-85310-977-0
