= John William Waterhouse =

English painter (1849–1917)

John William Waterhouse RA
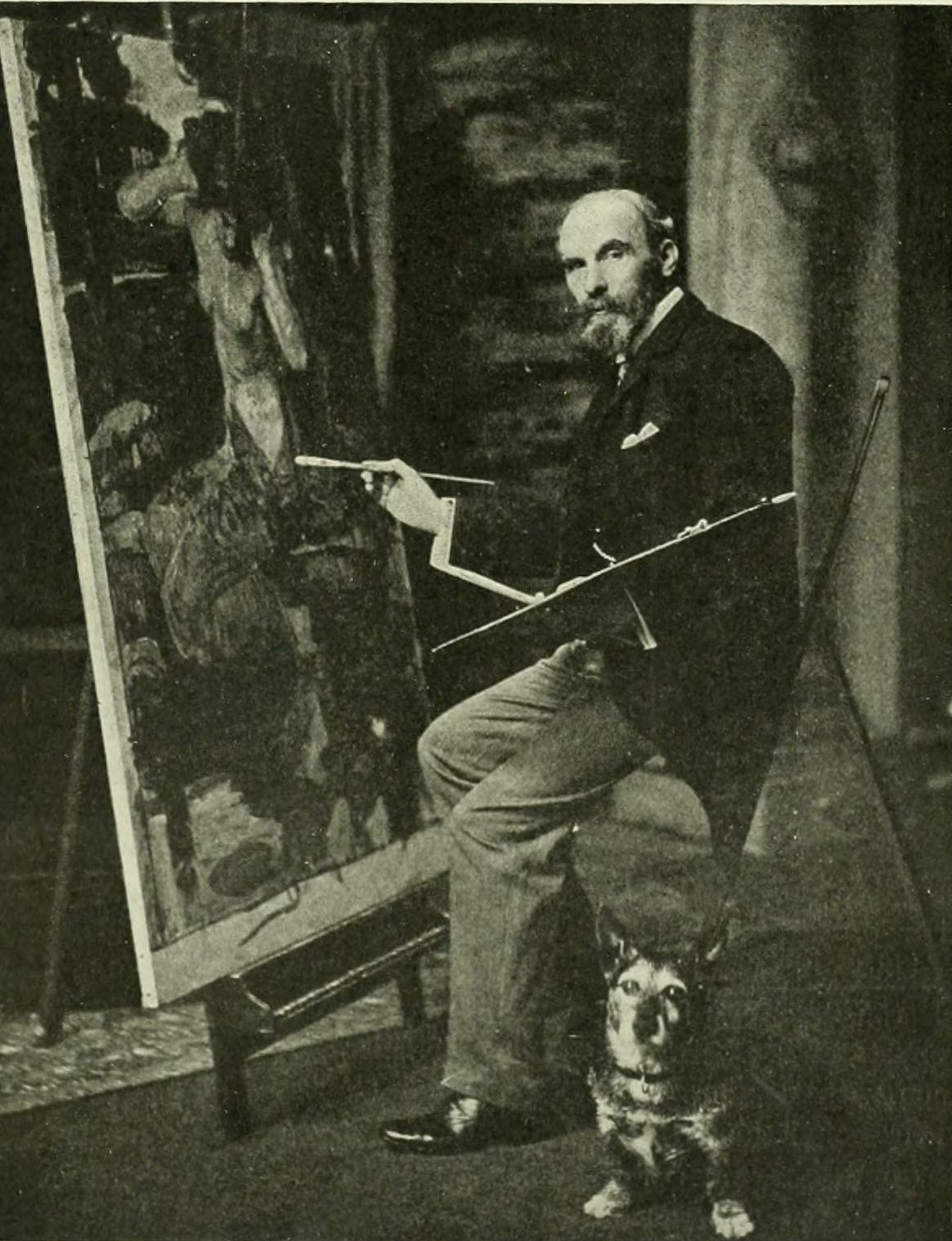
- Waterhouse, c. 1886
- Born: Rome, Roman Republic
- Baptised: 6 April 1849
- Died: 10 February 1917 (aged 68); London, England
- Works: Hylas and the Nymphs; The Lady of Shalott; The Magic Circle; Ophelia; A Mermaid
- Movement: Pre-Raphaelite
- Spouse: Esther Kenworthy (m. 1883)

John William Waterhouse RA (baptised 6 April 1849 – 10 February 1917) was an English painter known for working first in the Academic style and for then embracing the Pre-Raphaelite Brotherhood's style and subject matter. His paintings are known for their depictions of women from ancient Greek mythology, Arthurian legend, and the works of William Shakespeare. A high proportion depict a single young and beautiful woman in a historical costume and setting, though there are some ventures into Orientalist painting and genre painting, still mostly featuring women.

Born in Rome to English parents who were both painters, Waterhouse later moved to London, where he enrolled in the Royal Academy of Art Schools. He soon began exhibiting at their annual summer exhibitions, focusing on the creation of large canvas works depicting scenes from the daily life and mythology of ancient Greece. Many of his paintings are based on authors such as Homer, Ovid, Shakespeare, Tennyson, or Keats.

Waterhouse's work is displayed in many major art museums and galleries, and the Royal Academy of Art organised a major retrospective of his work in 2009.

== Biography ==
=== Early life ===
Waterhouse was born in the city of Rome to the English painters William and Isabella Waterhouse in 1849, in the same year that the members of the Pre-Raphaelite Brotherhood, including Dante Gabriel Rossetti, John Everett Millais and William Holman Hunt, were first causing a stir in the London art scene. The exact date of his birth is unknown, though he was baptised on 6 April, and the later scholar of Waterhouse's work, Peter Trippi, believed that he was born between 1 and 23 January. His early life in Italy has been cited as one of the reasons many of his later paintings were set in ancient Rome or based upon scenes taken from Roman mythology.

In 1854, the Waterhouses returned to England and moved to a newly built house in South Kensington, London, which was near to the newly founded Victoria and Albert Museum. Waterhouse, or 'Nino' as he was nicknamed, coming from an artistic family, was encouraged to become involved in drawing, and often sketched artworks that he found in the British Museum and the National Gallery. In 1871, he entered the Royal Academy of Art school, initially to study sculpture, before moving on to painting.

=== Early career ===
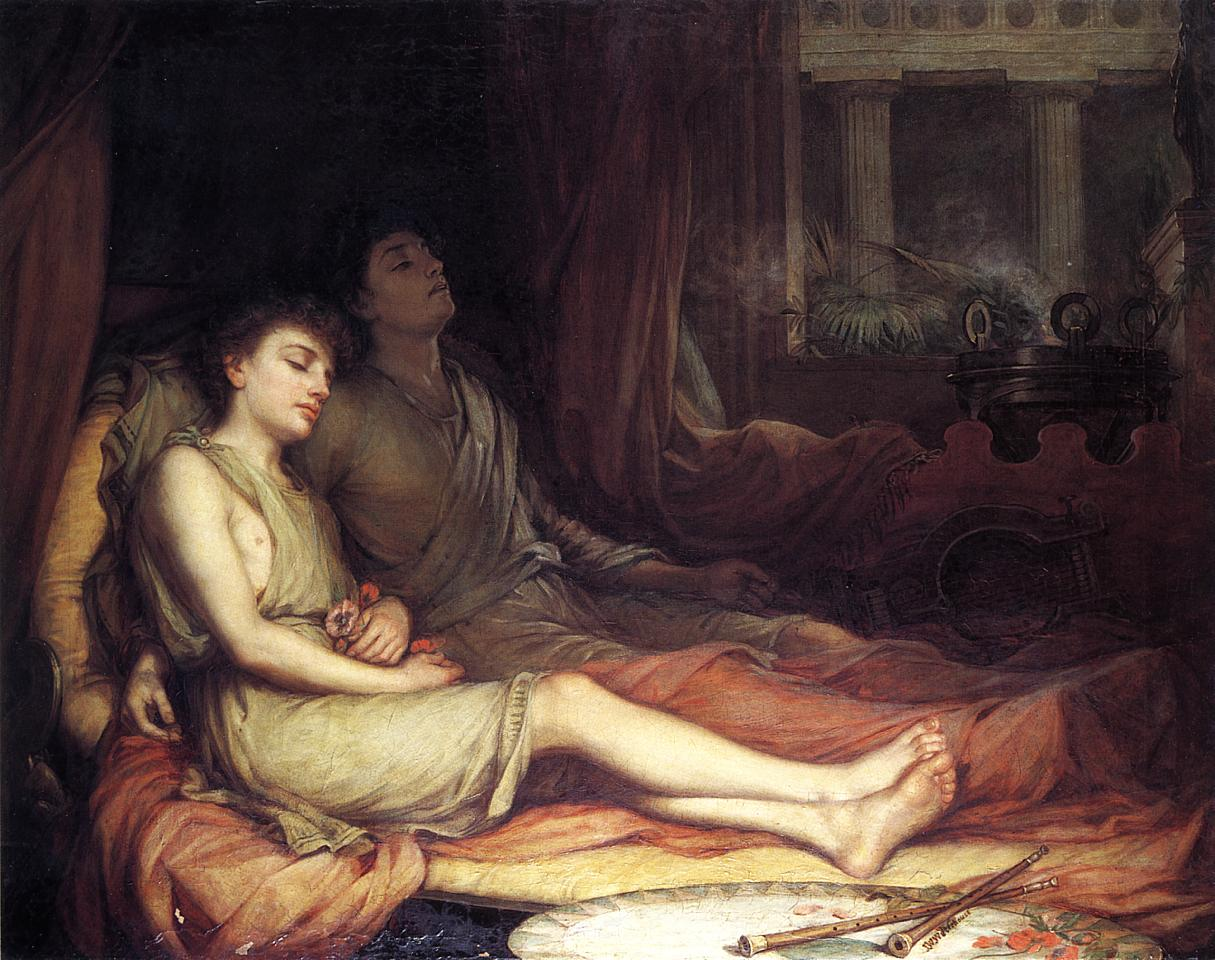
Sleep and his Half-brother Death, 1874

Waterhouse's early works were not Pre-Raphaelite in nature, but were of classical themes in the spirit of Alma-Tadema and Frederic Leighton. Those early works were exhibited at the Dudley Gallery, and the Society of British Artists, and in 1874 his painting Sleep and his Half-brother Death was exhibited at the Royal Academy summer exhibition. The painting was a success and Waterhouse went on to display his work at the annual exhibition every year until 1916, with the exception of 1890 and 1915. He then went from strength to strength in the London art scene. His 1876 piece, After the Dance, was given the prime position in that year's summer exhibition. Perhaps due to his success, his paintings typically became larger.

Some of Waterhouse's early works have not been analysed or reviewed. Many are part of private collections, so very few people have access to them. The Slave (1872) has no analysis, despite the complicated subject matter evoked by the title and scene, as well as the curious nature of the unusual subjects: they are Arabs and there is no clear narrative origin, whereas Waterhouse tended to depict classical stories from Europe. However, a sketch book of Waterhouse's from that period included other studies of Arab models, indicating a fascination with the oriental that did not last beyond his early art. This can further be seen in the sketch An Eastern Reminiscence. Portrait of a Young Woman (c. 1875–78) was completely unknown until the painting was discovered on the BBC television programme The Antiques Roadshow, featuring with a hole in the canvas. It was included in Peter Trippi's Waterhouse monograph.

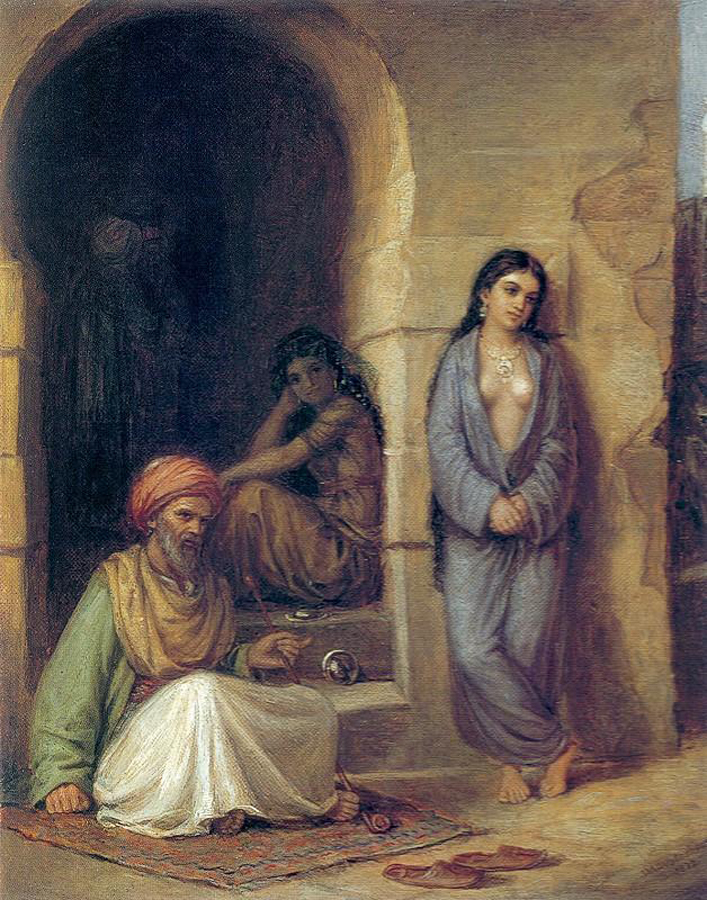
The Slave, 1872

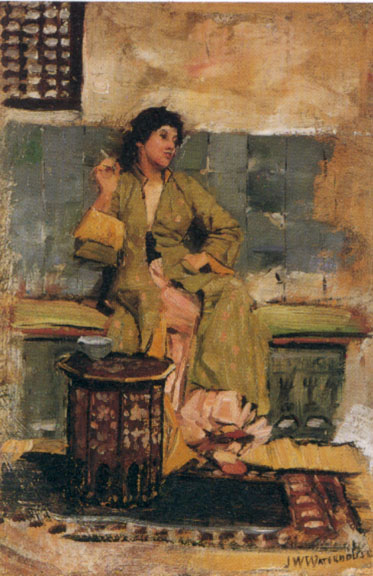
An Eastern Reminiscence (sketch), c. 1874

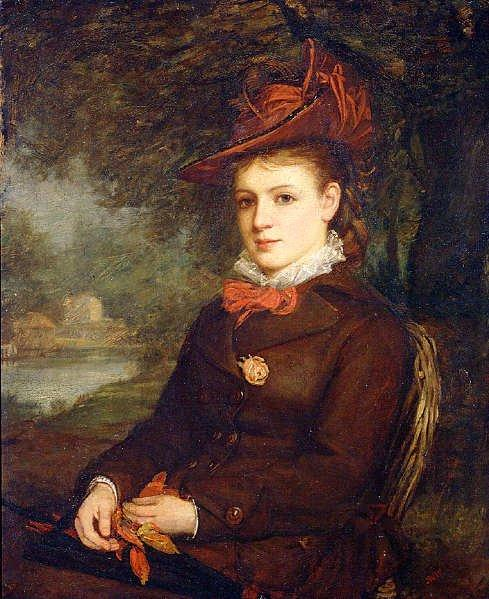
Portrait of a Young Woman, c. 1875–1878

=== Later career ===
In 1883, Waterhouse married Esther Kenworthy, the daughter of an art schoolmaster from Ealing who had exhibited her own flower-paintings at the Royal Academy and elsewhere. In 1895 Waterhouse was elected to the status of full Academician. He taught at the St. John's Wood Art School, joined the St John's Wood Arts Club, and served on the Royal Academy Council.

One of Waterhouse's best known subjects is The Lady of Shalott, a study of Elaine of Astolat as depicted in the 1832 poem by Alfred, Lord Tennyson, who dies of a mysterious curse after looking directly at the beautiful Lancelot. He actually painted three different versions of this character, in 1888, 1894, and 1916. Another of Waterhouse's favorite subjects was Ophelia; the most familiar of his paintings of Ophelia depicts her just before her death, putting flowers in her hair as she sits on a tree branch leaning over a lake. Like The Lady of Shalott and other Waterhouse paintings, it deals with a woman dying in or near water. He may also have been inspired by paintings of Ophelia by Dante Gabriel Rossetti and John Everett Millais.

He submitted his 1888 Ophelia painting in order to receive his diploma from the Royal Academy. (He had originally wanted to submit a painting titled A Mermaid, but it was not completed in time.) After this, the painting was lost until the 20th century. It is now displayed in the collection of Lord Lloyd-Webber. Waterhouse would paint Ophelia again in 1894 and 1909 or 1910, and he planned another painting in the series, called Ophelia in the Churchyard.

Waterhouse could not finish the series of Ophelia paintings because he was gravely ill with cancer by 1915. He died two years later, and his grave can be found at Kensal Green Cemetery in London.

== Gallery ==
In total, he produced 118 paintings. See List of paintings by John William Waterhouse for an almost complete list.

=== 1870s ===
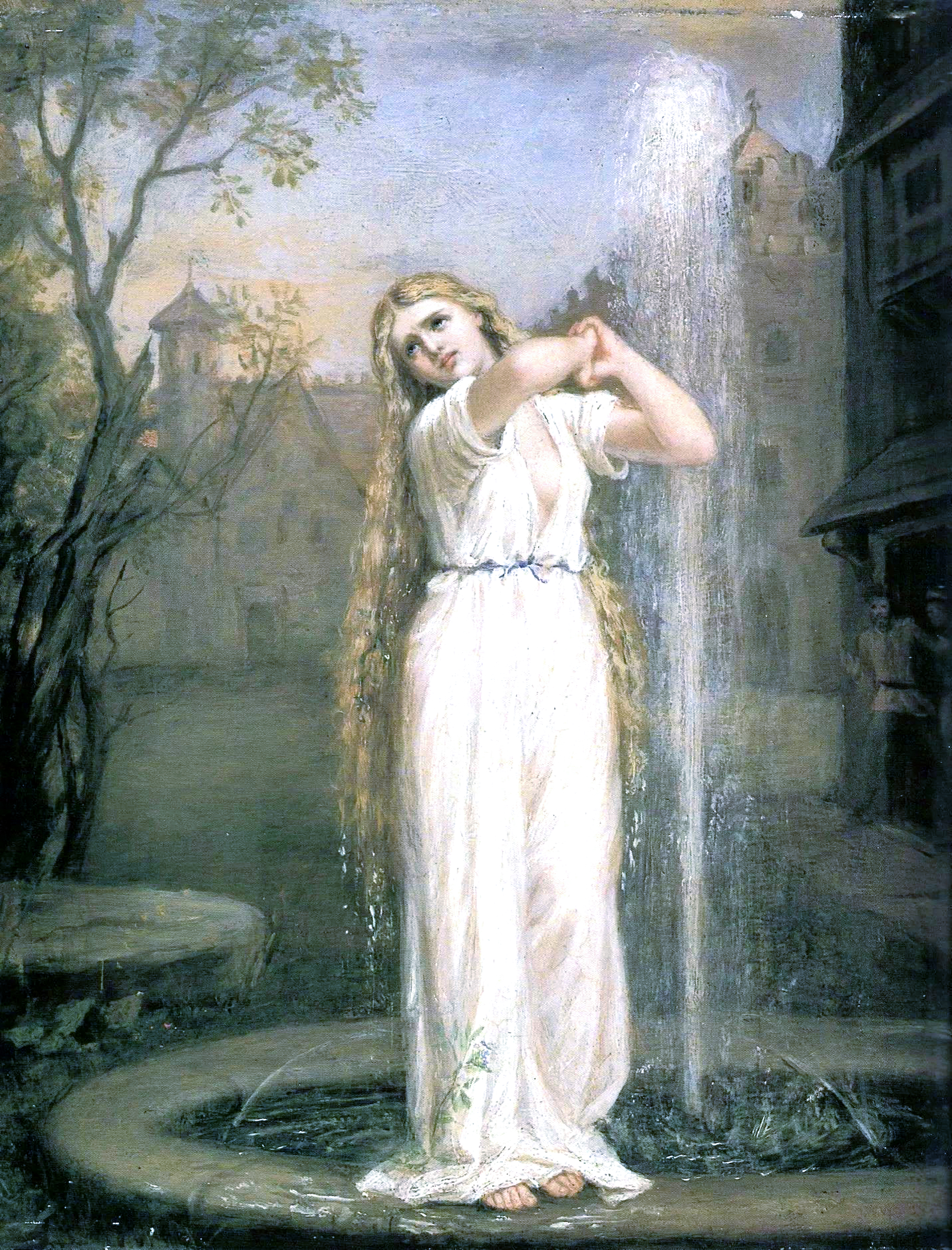
Undine
1872

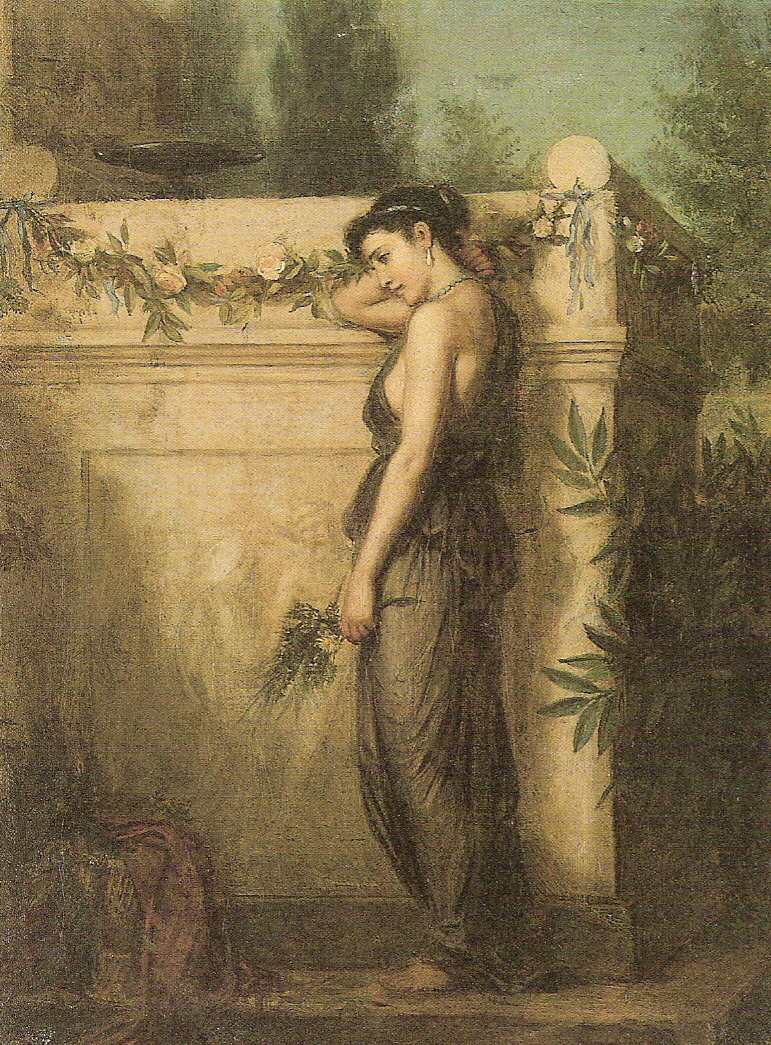
Gone, But Not Forgotten
1873

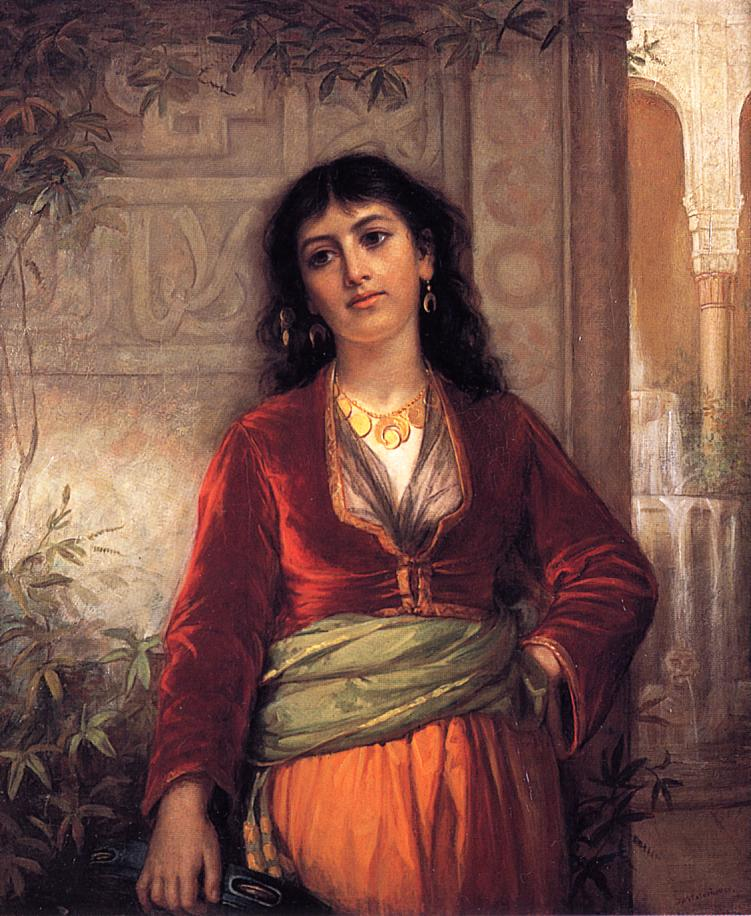
The Unwelcome Companion: A Street Scene in Cairo
1873

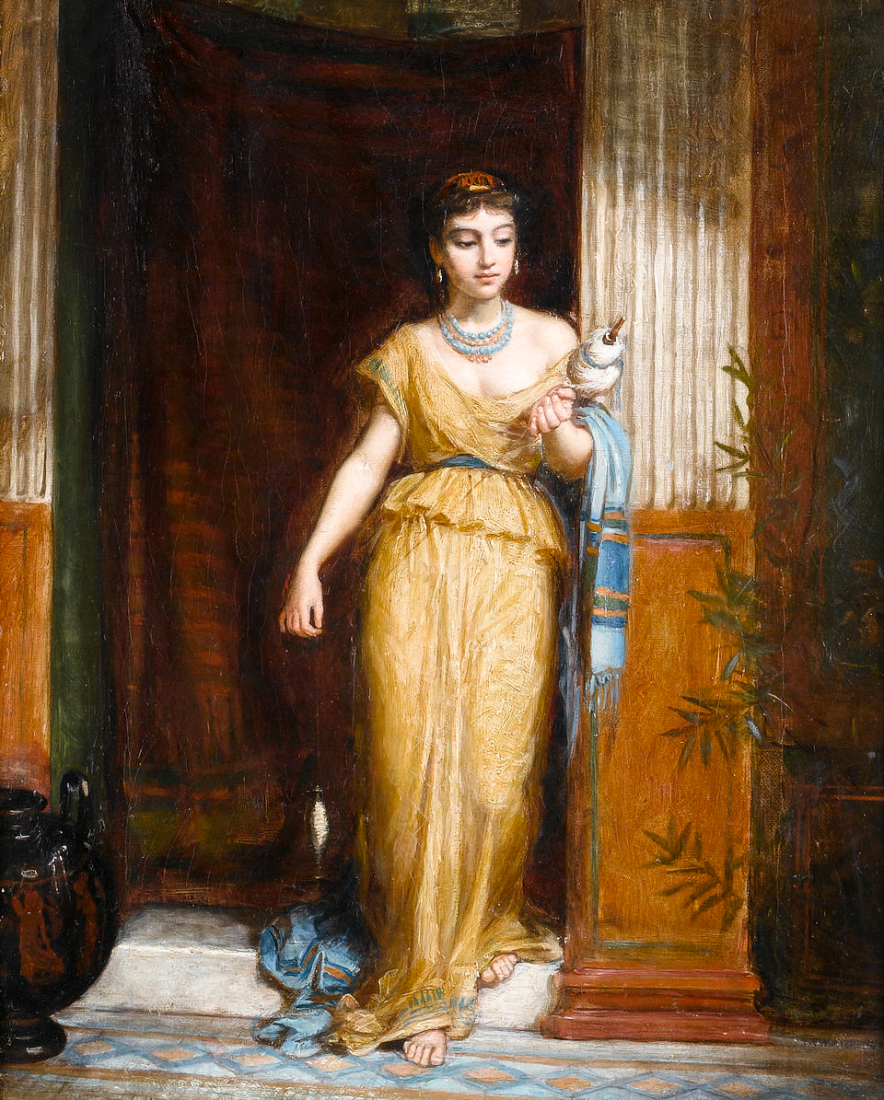
La Fileuse
1874

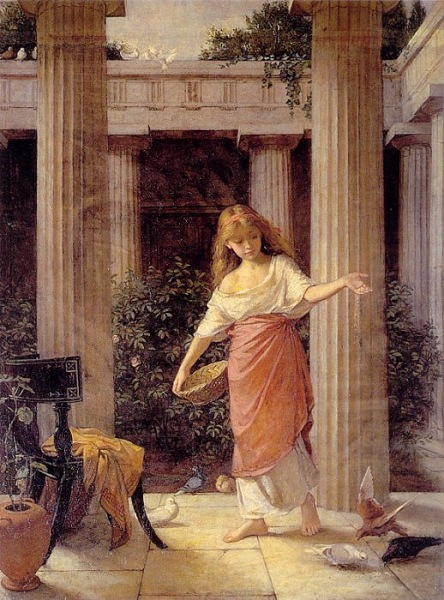
In the Peristyle
1874

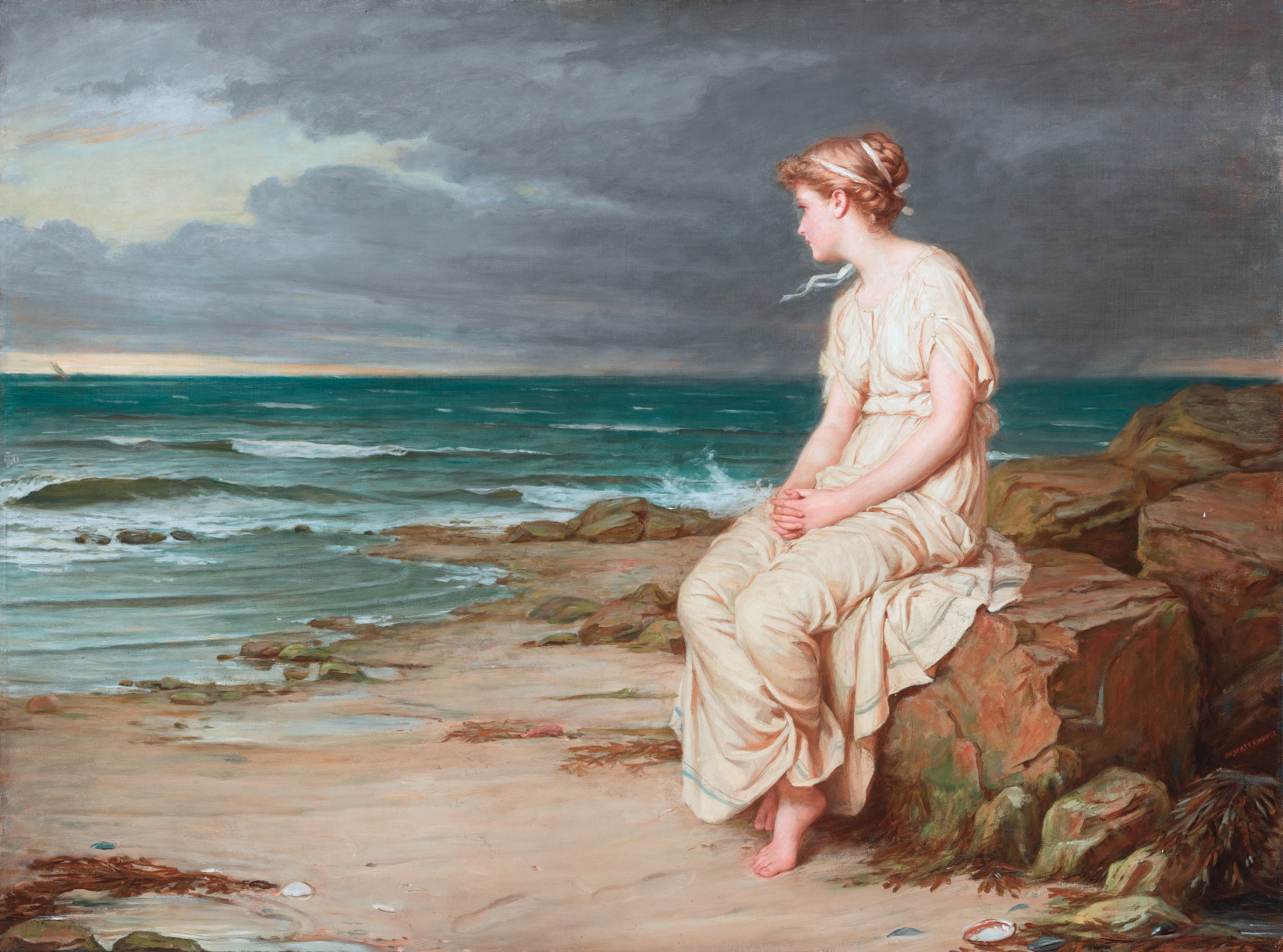
Miranda
1875

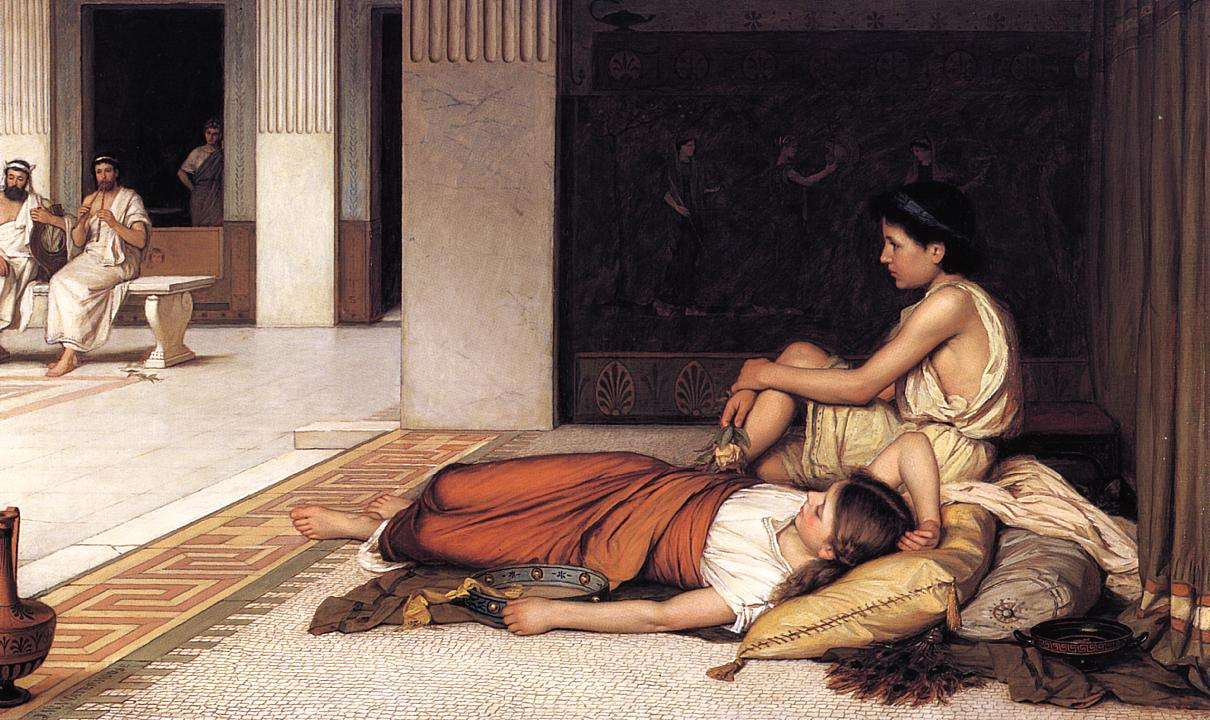
After the Dance
1876

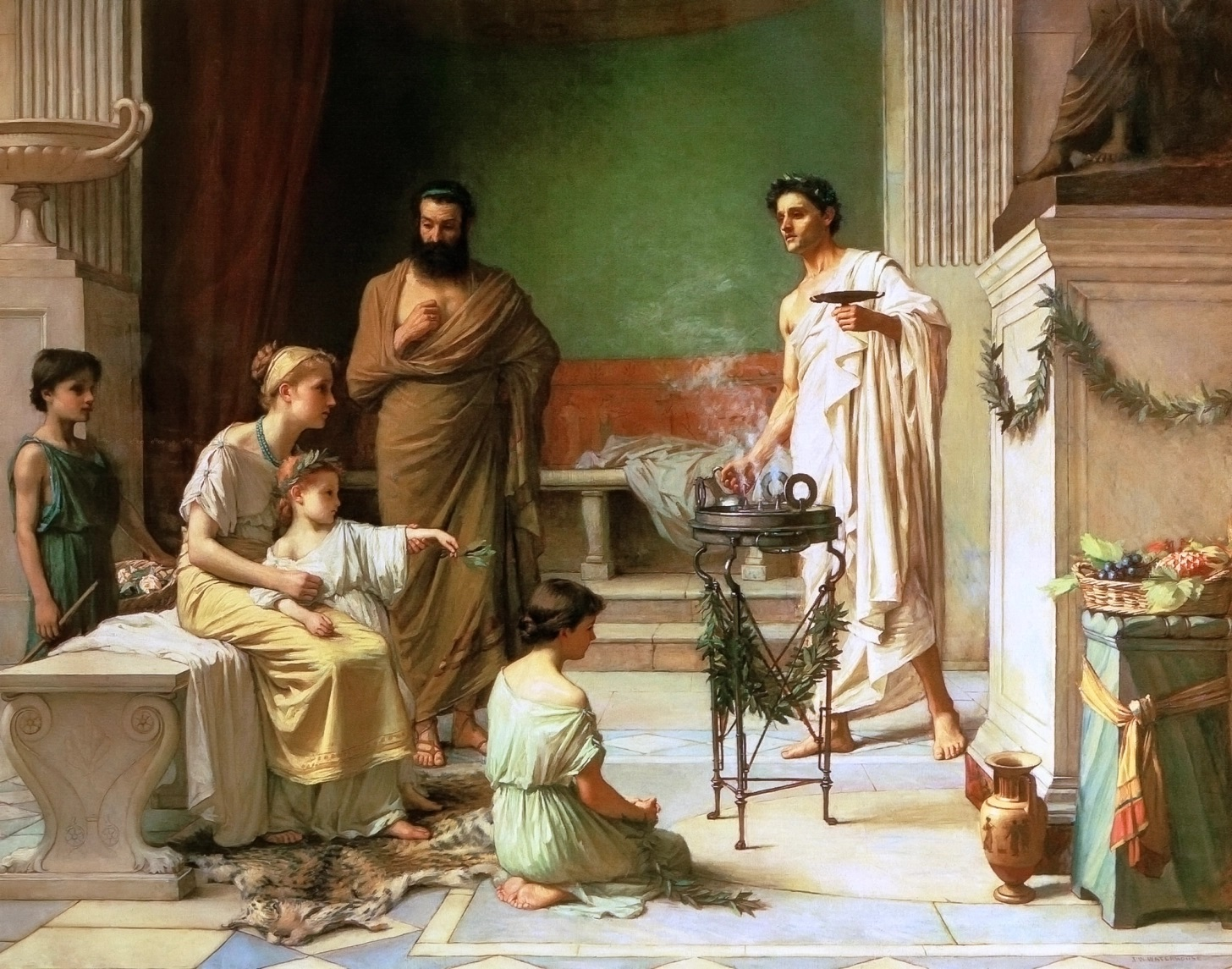
A Sick Child brought into the Temple of Aesculapius
1877

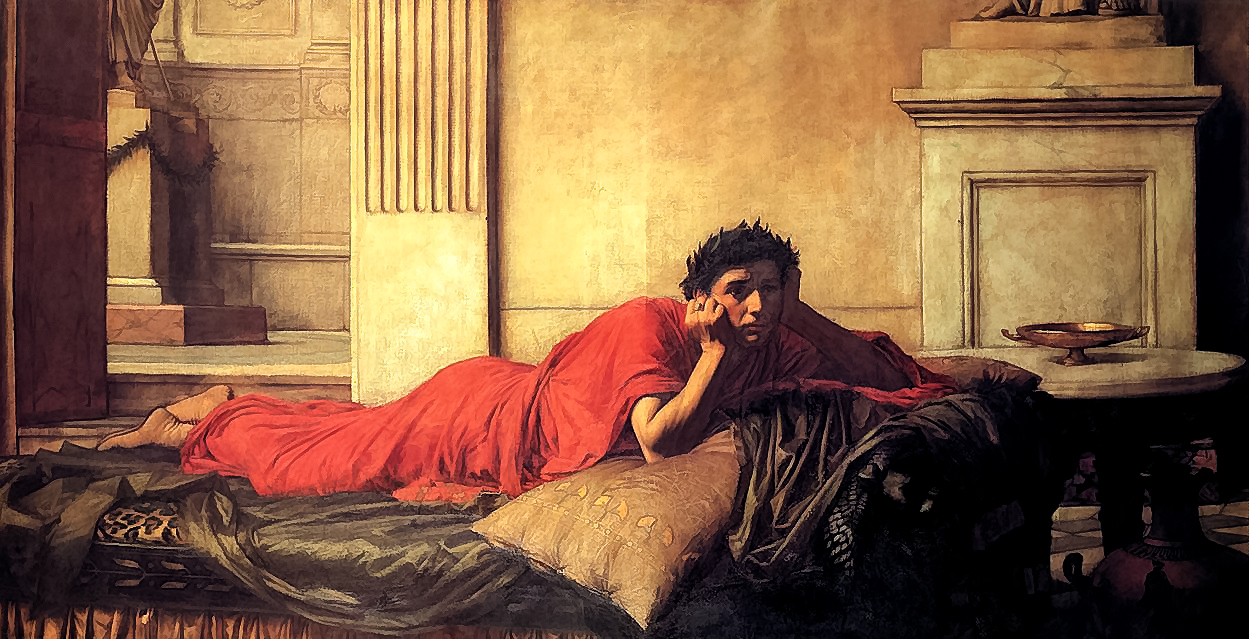
The Remorse of the Emperor Nero after the Murder of his Mother
1878

=== 1880s ===
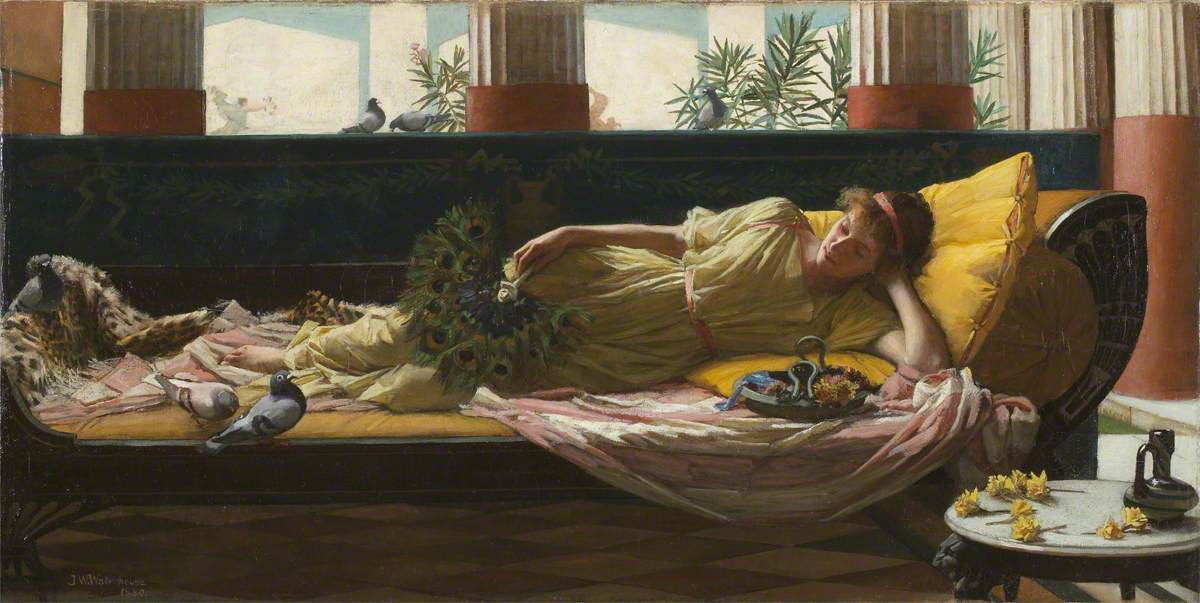
Dolce far Niente
1880

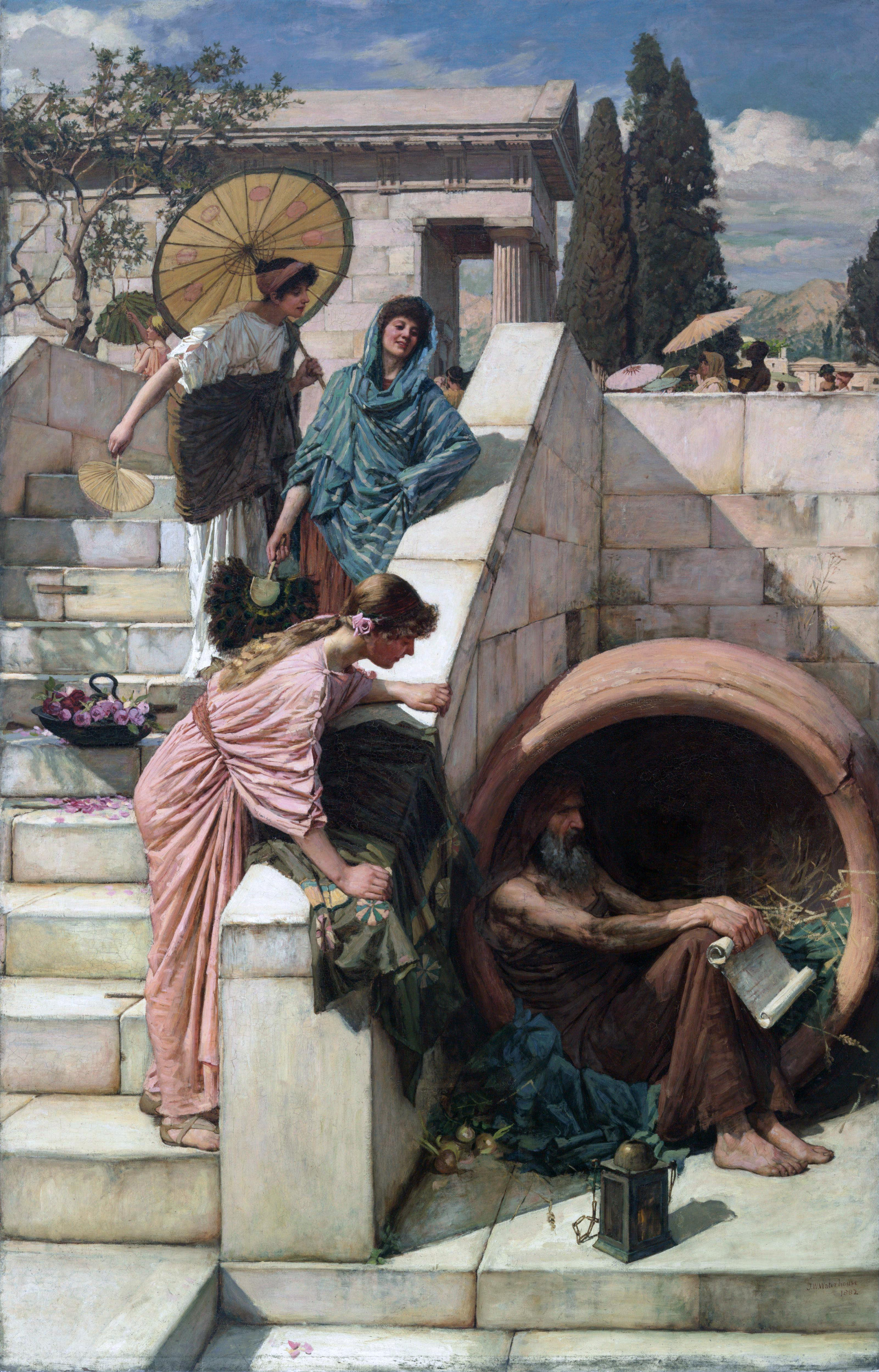
Diogenes
1882

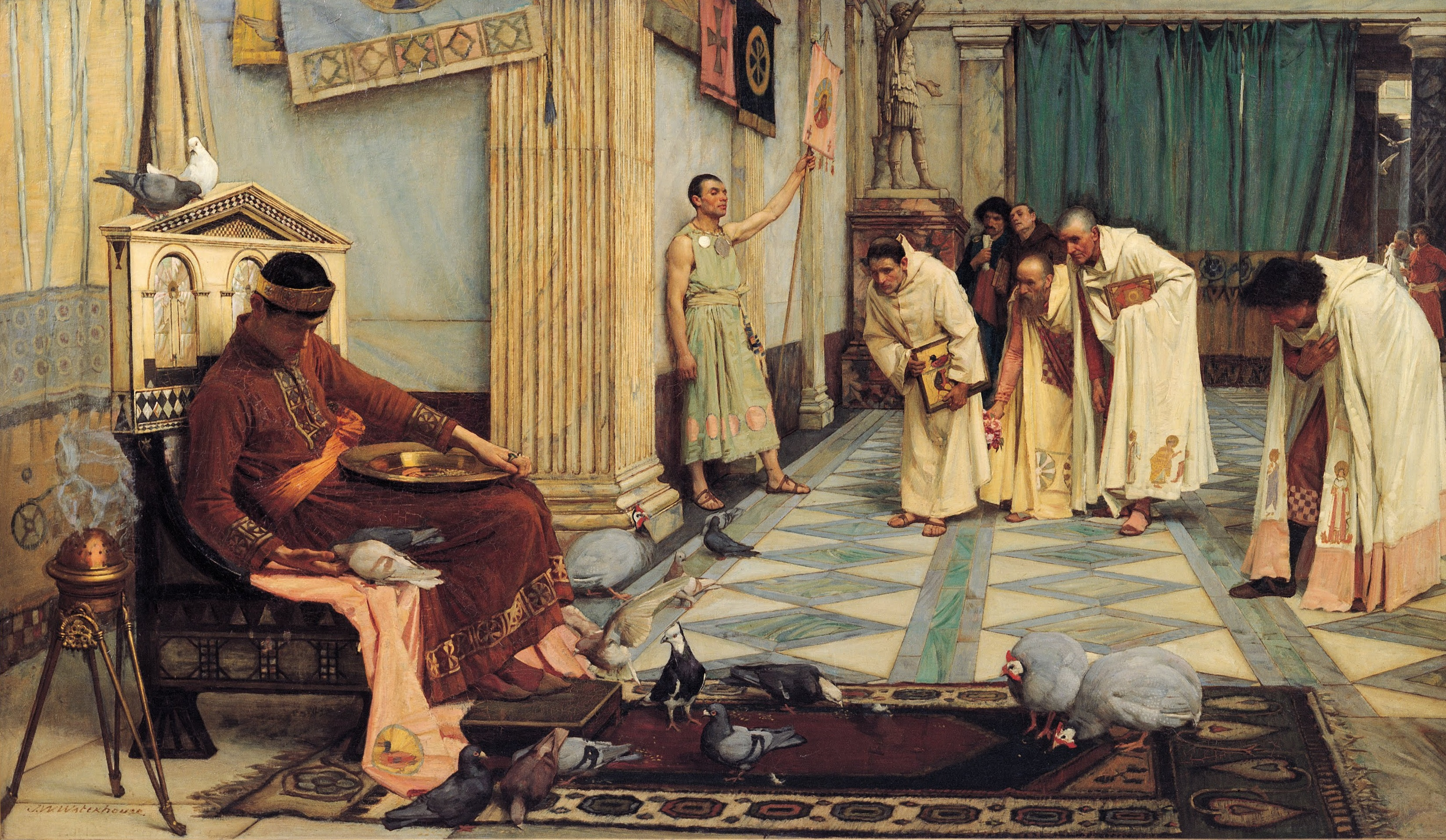
The Favourites of the Emperor Honorius
1883

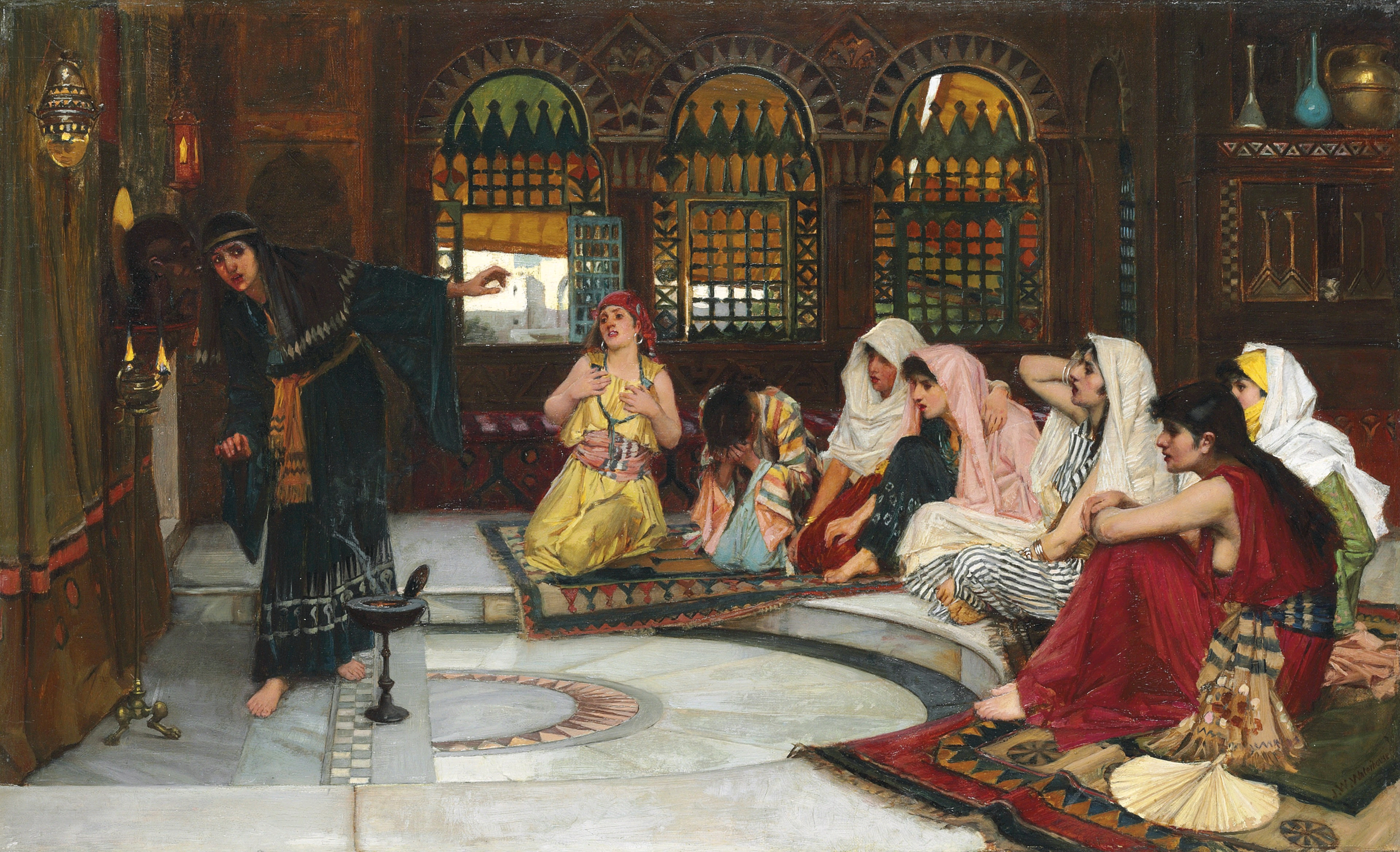
Consulting the Oracle
1884

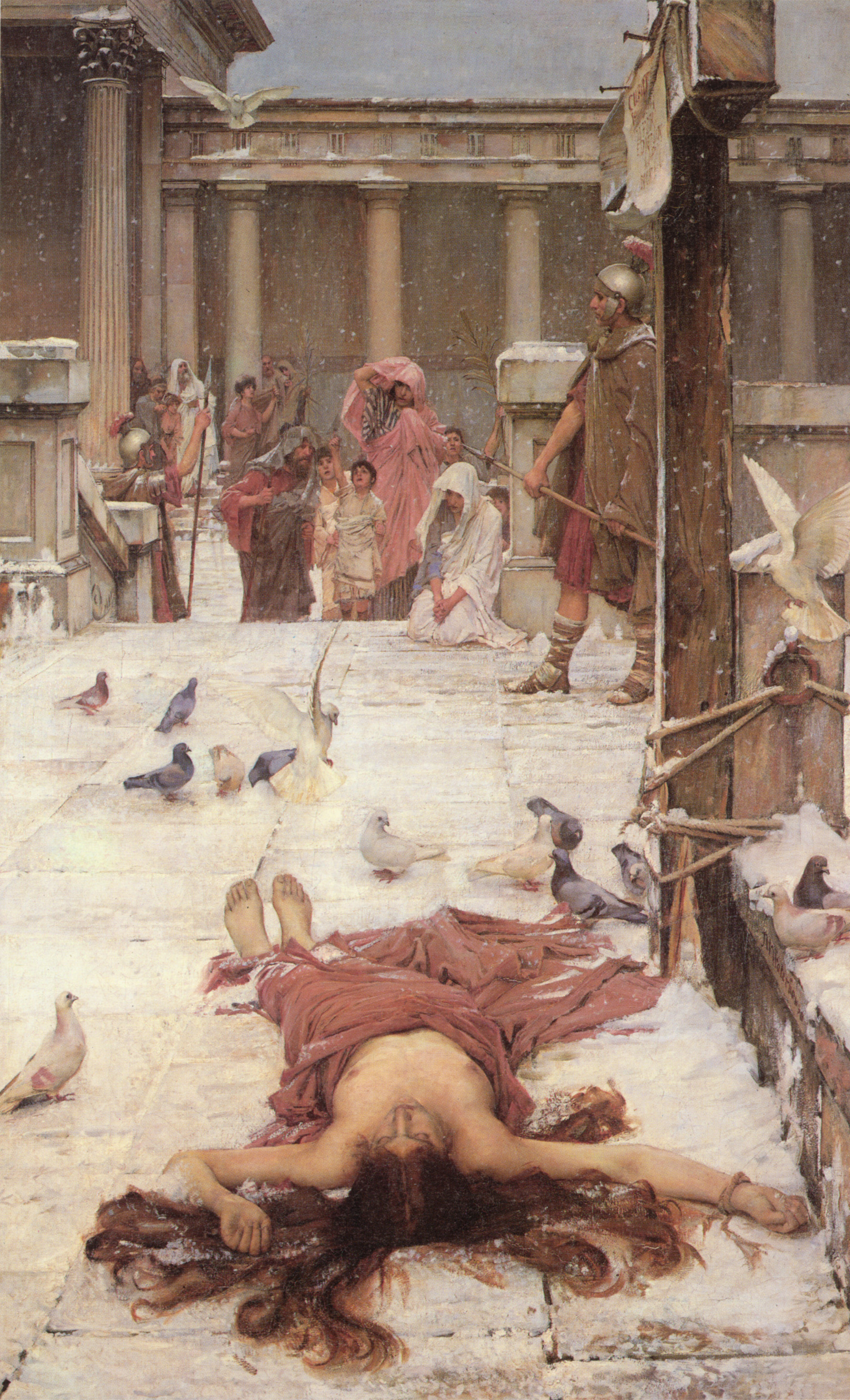
Saint Eulalia
1885

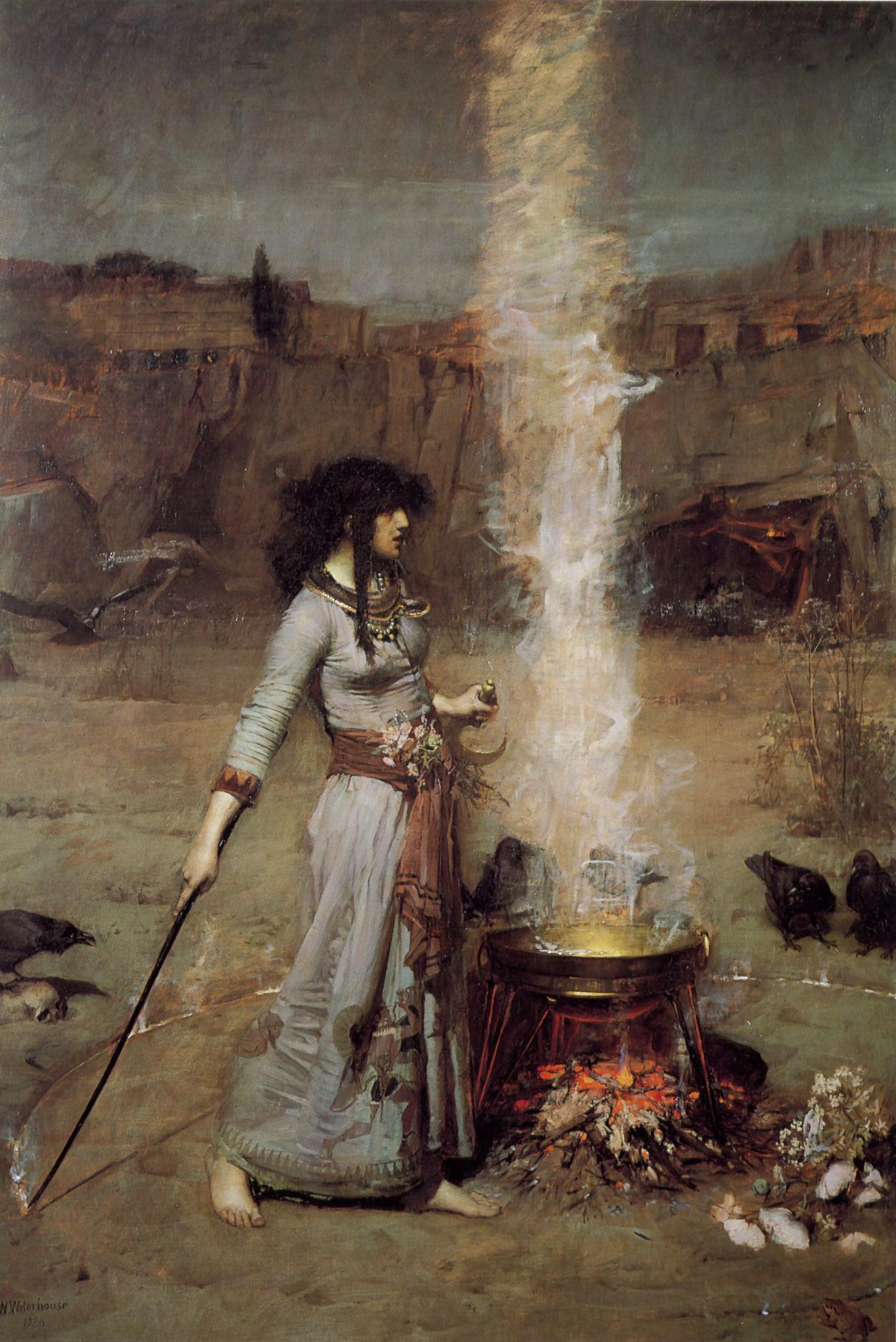
The Magic Circle
1886

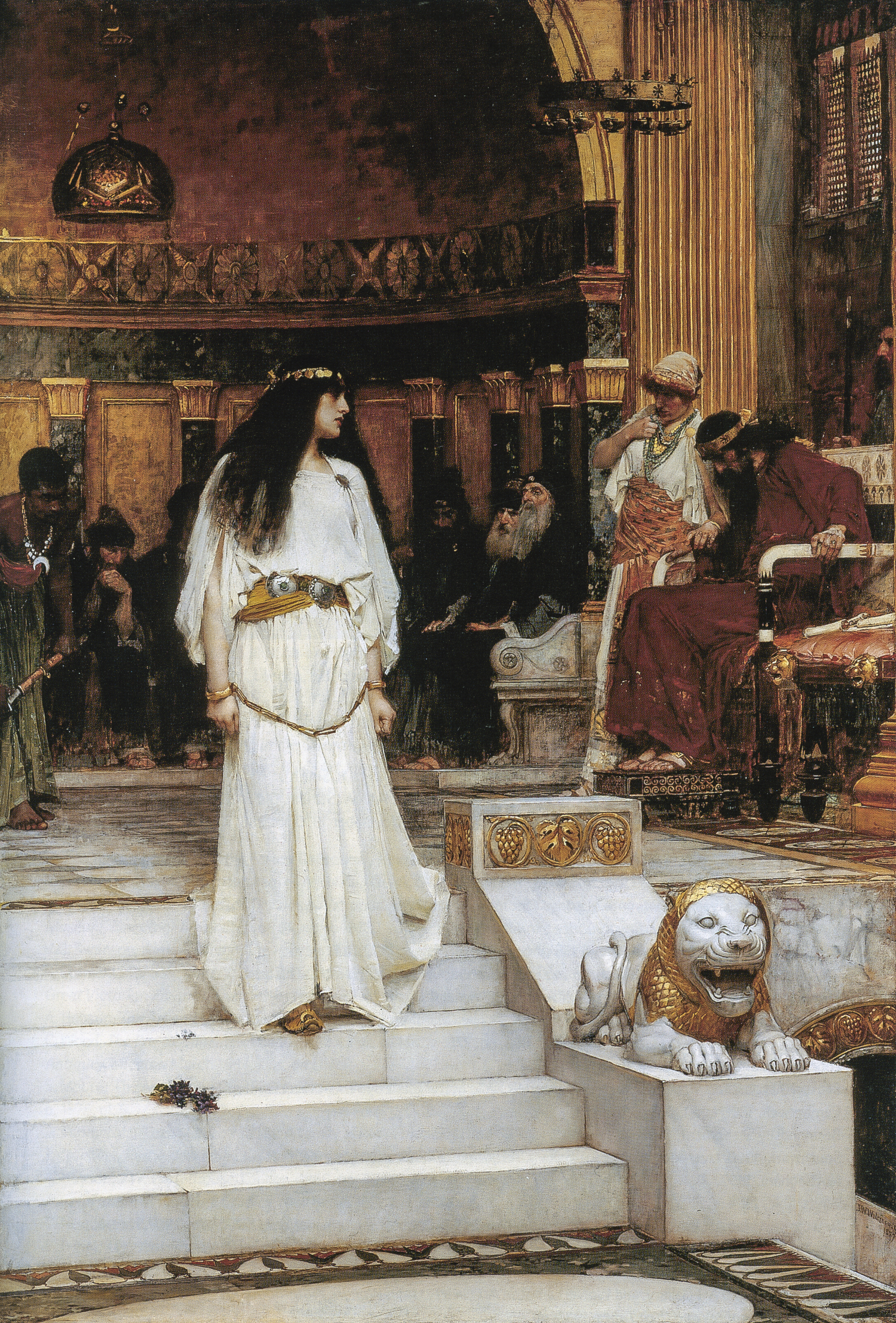
Mariamne Leaving the Judgement Seat of Herod
1887

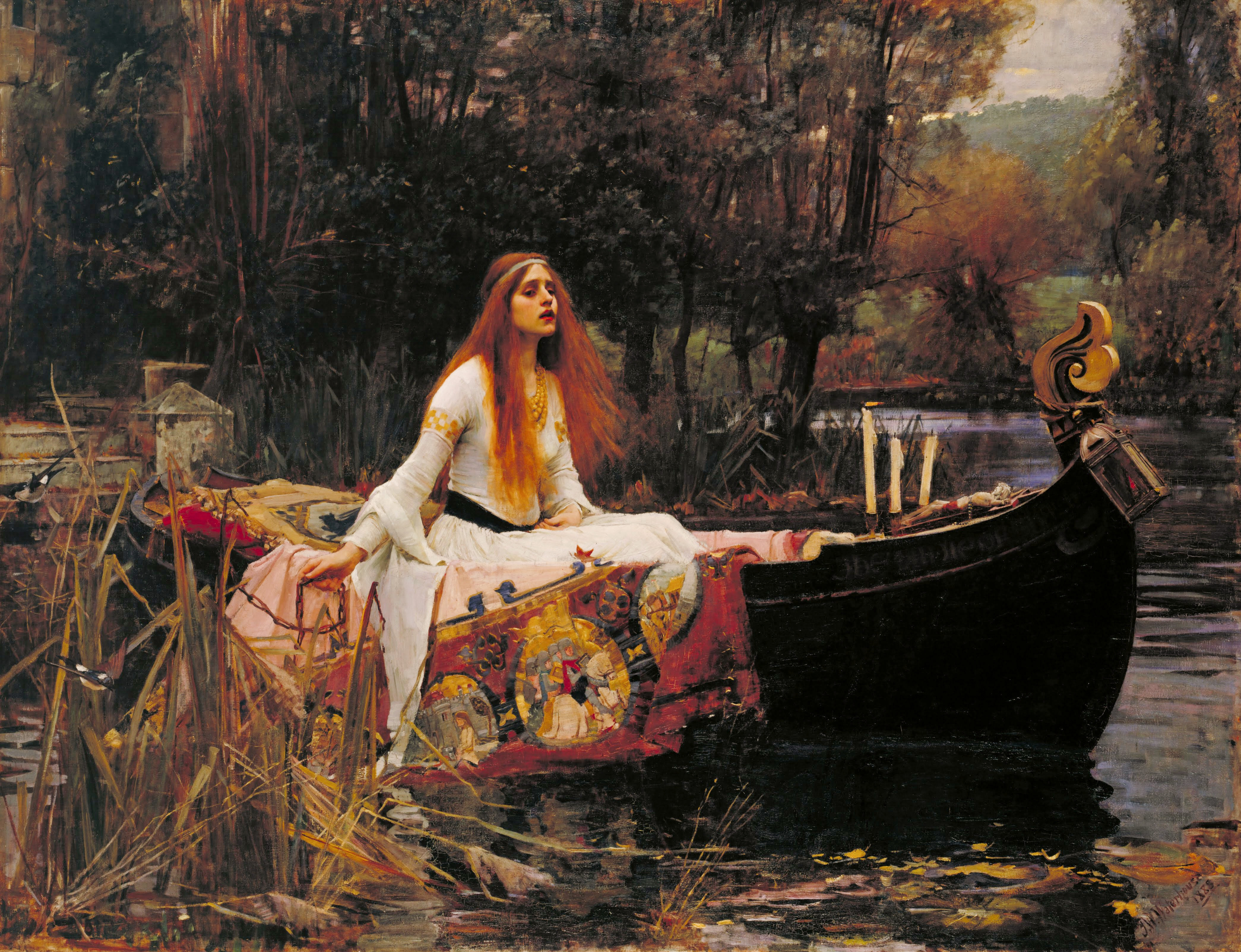
The Lady of Shalott
1888

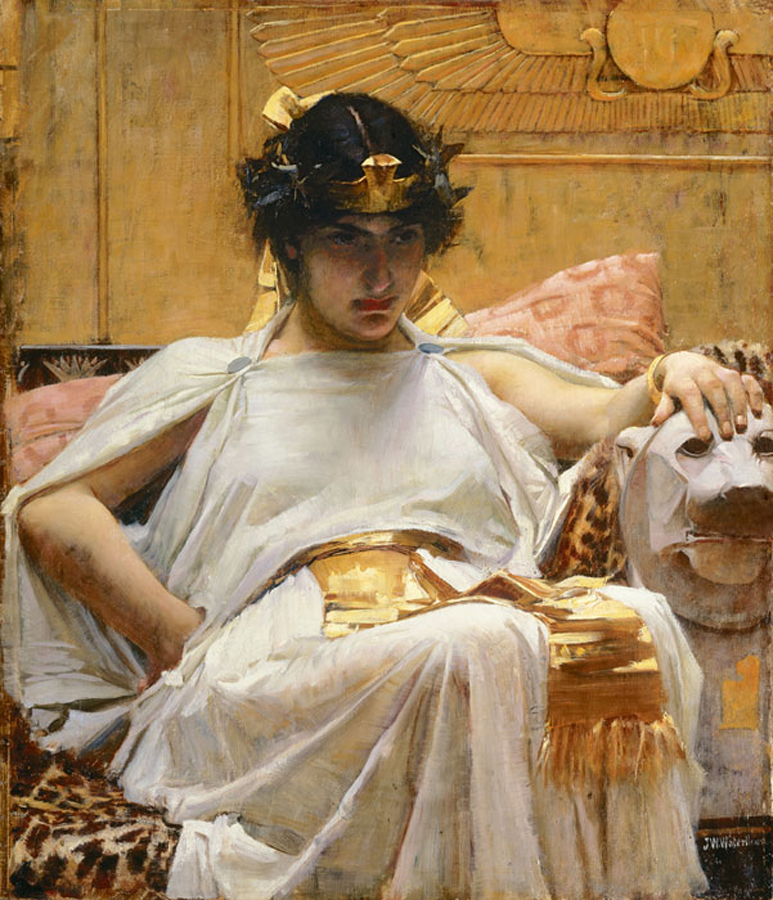
Cleopatra
1888

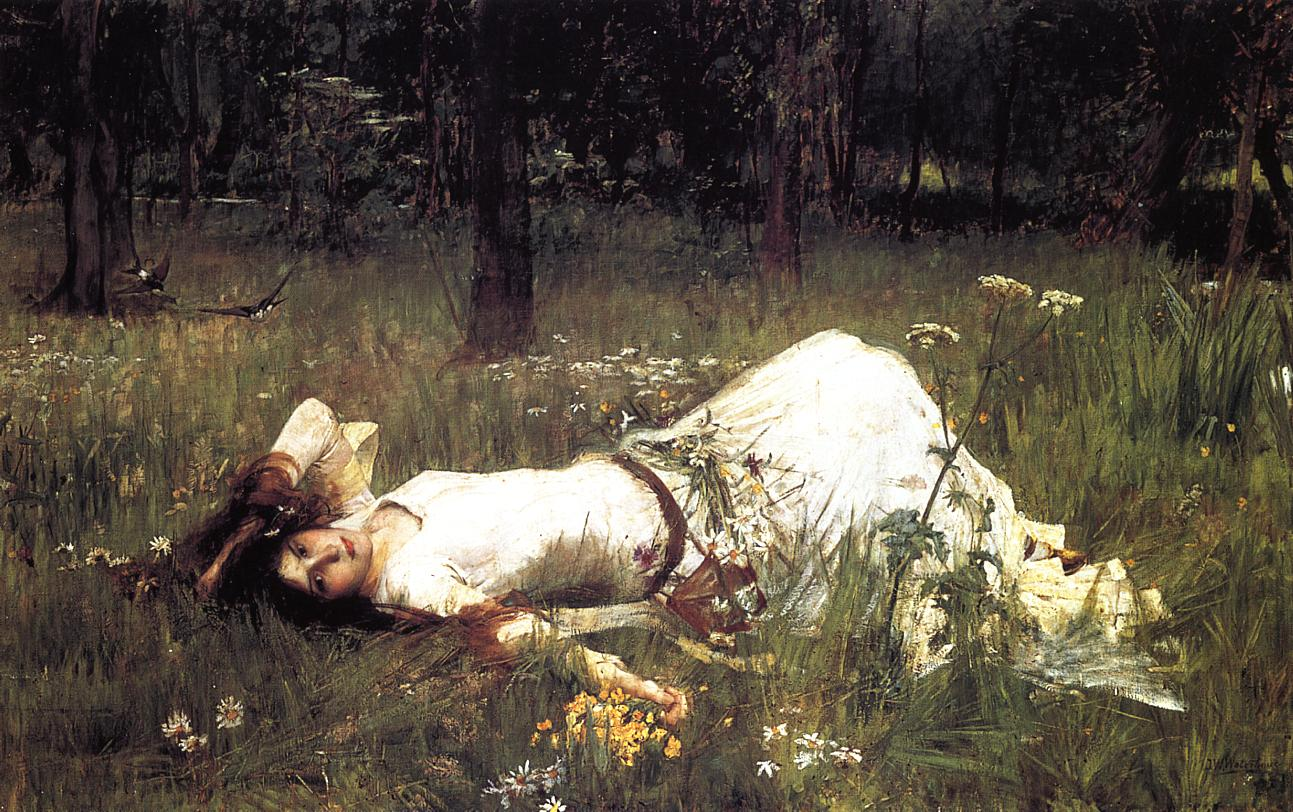
Ophelia
1889

=== 1890s ===
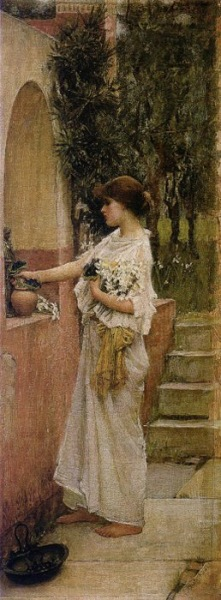
A Roman Offering
1890

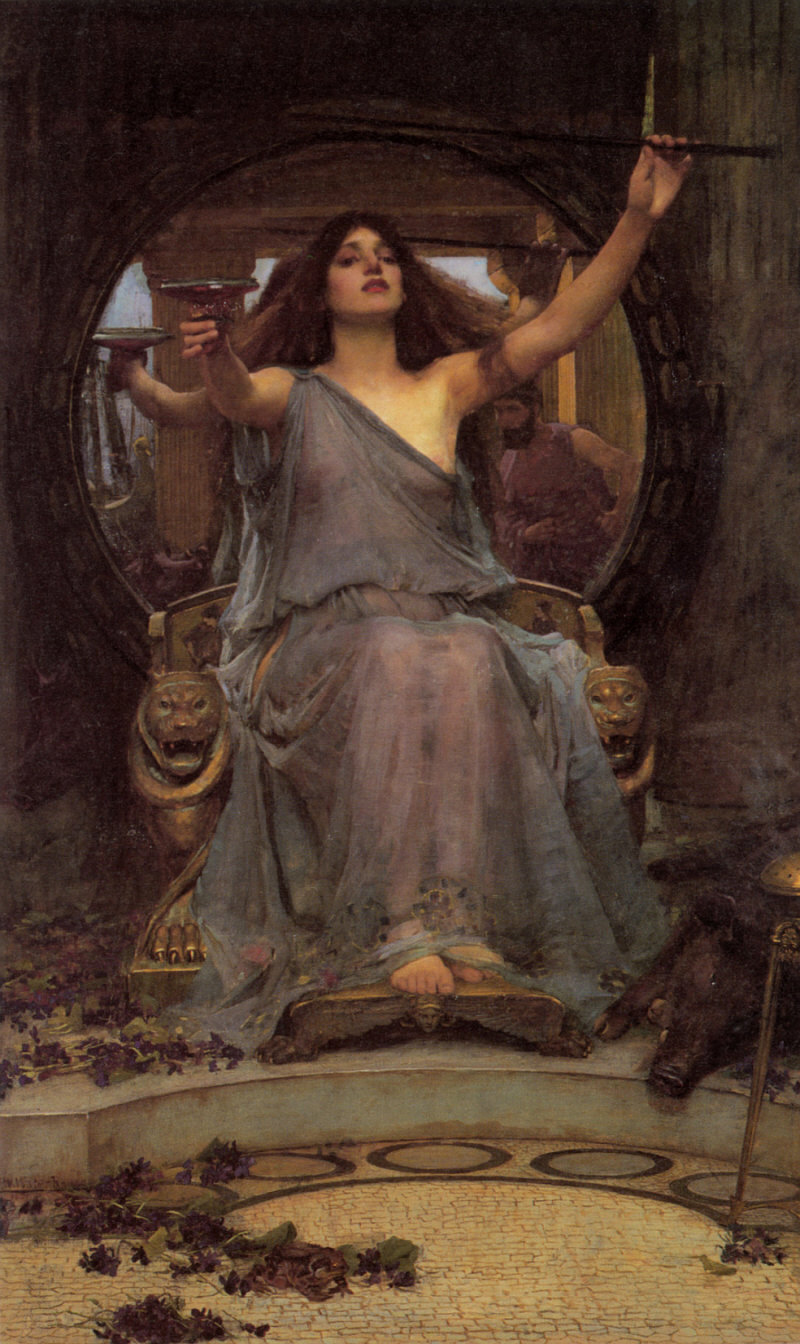
Circe Offering the Cup to Ulysses
1891

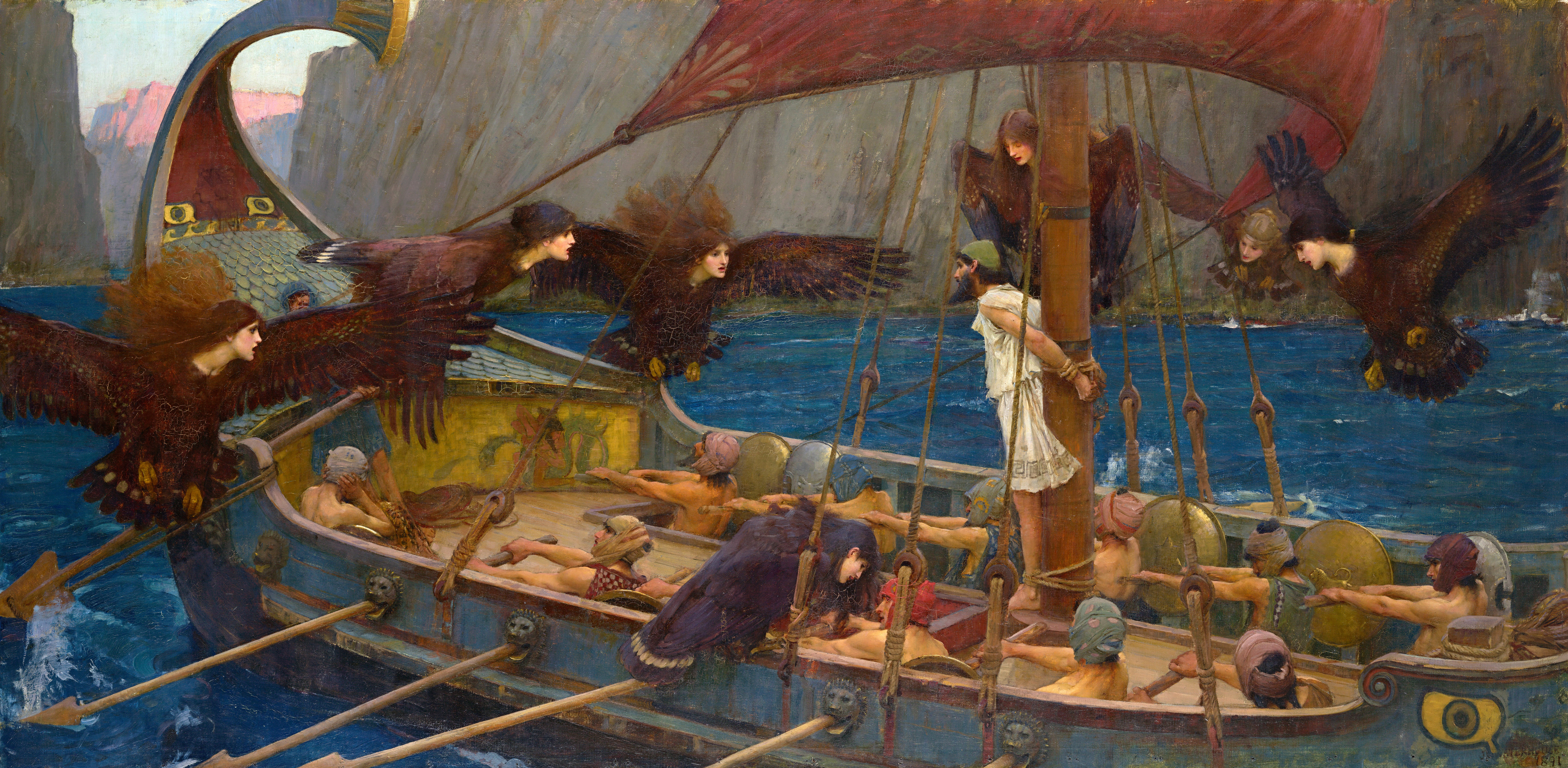
Ulysses and the Sirens
1891

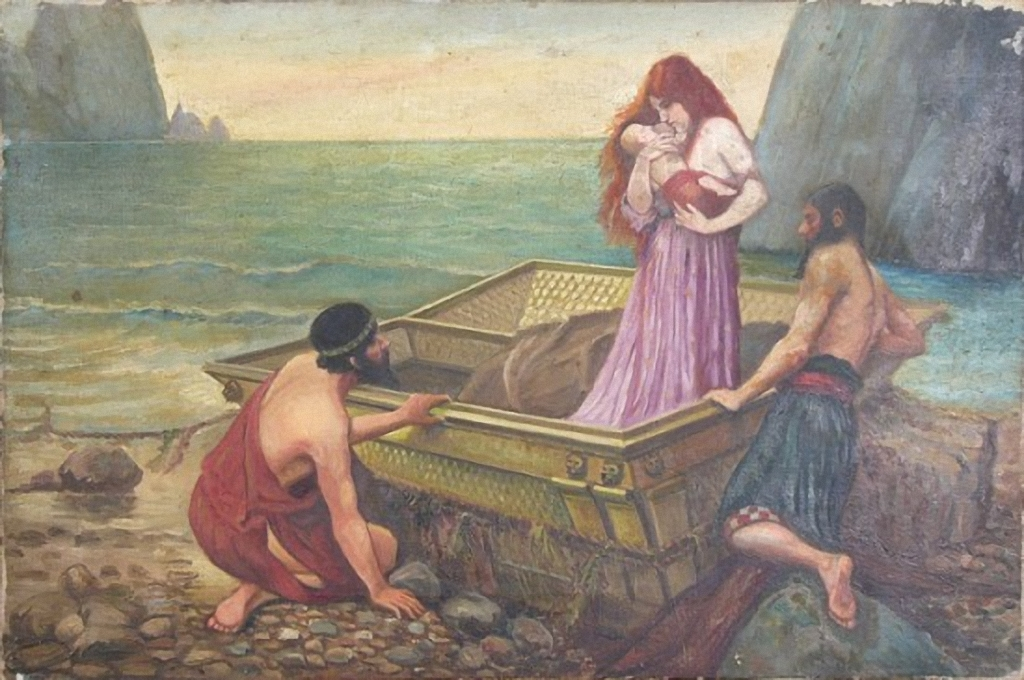
Danaë
1892

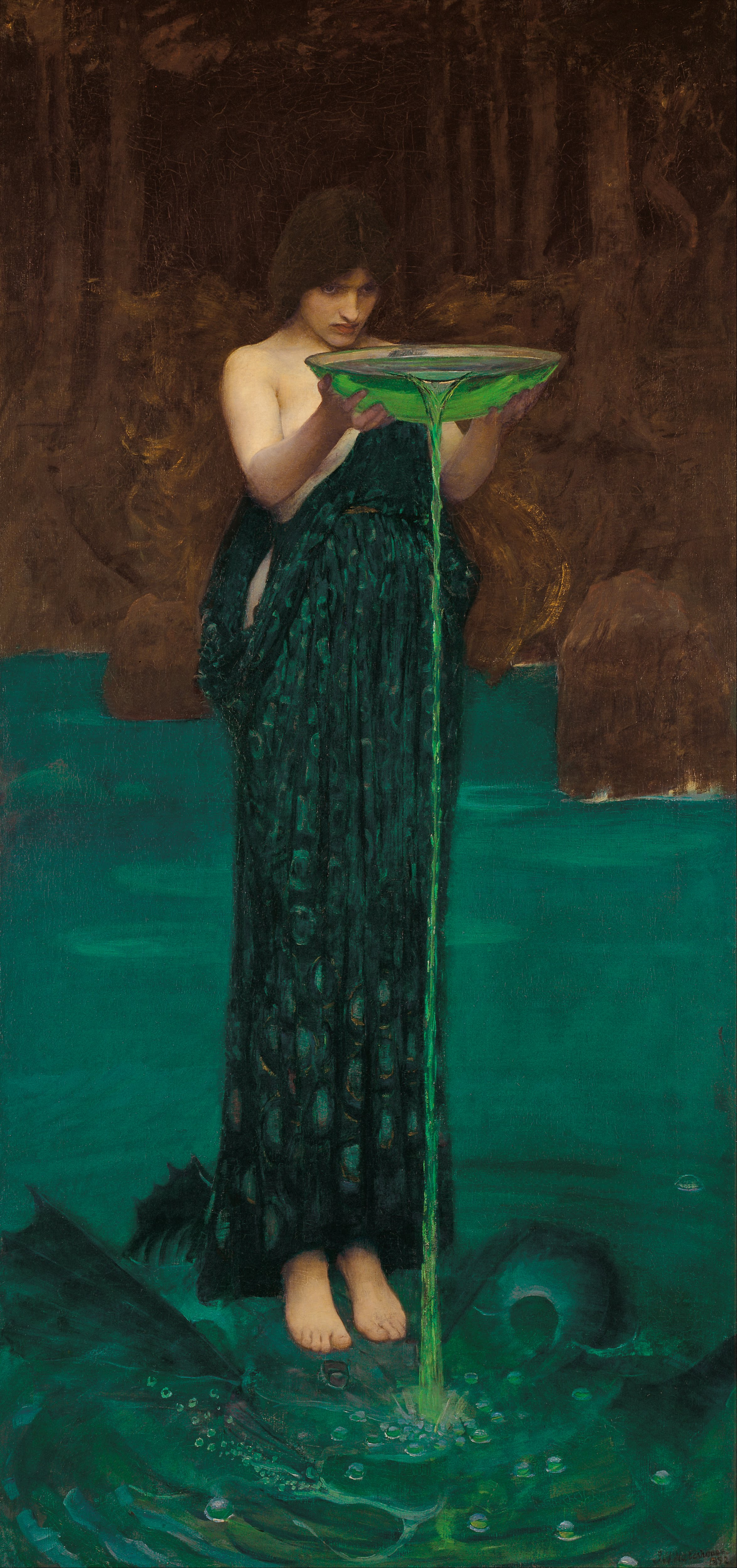
Circe Invidiosa
1892

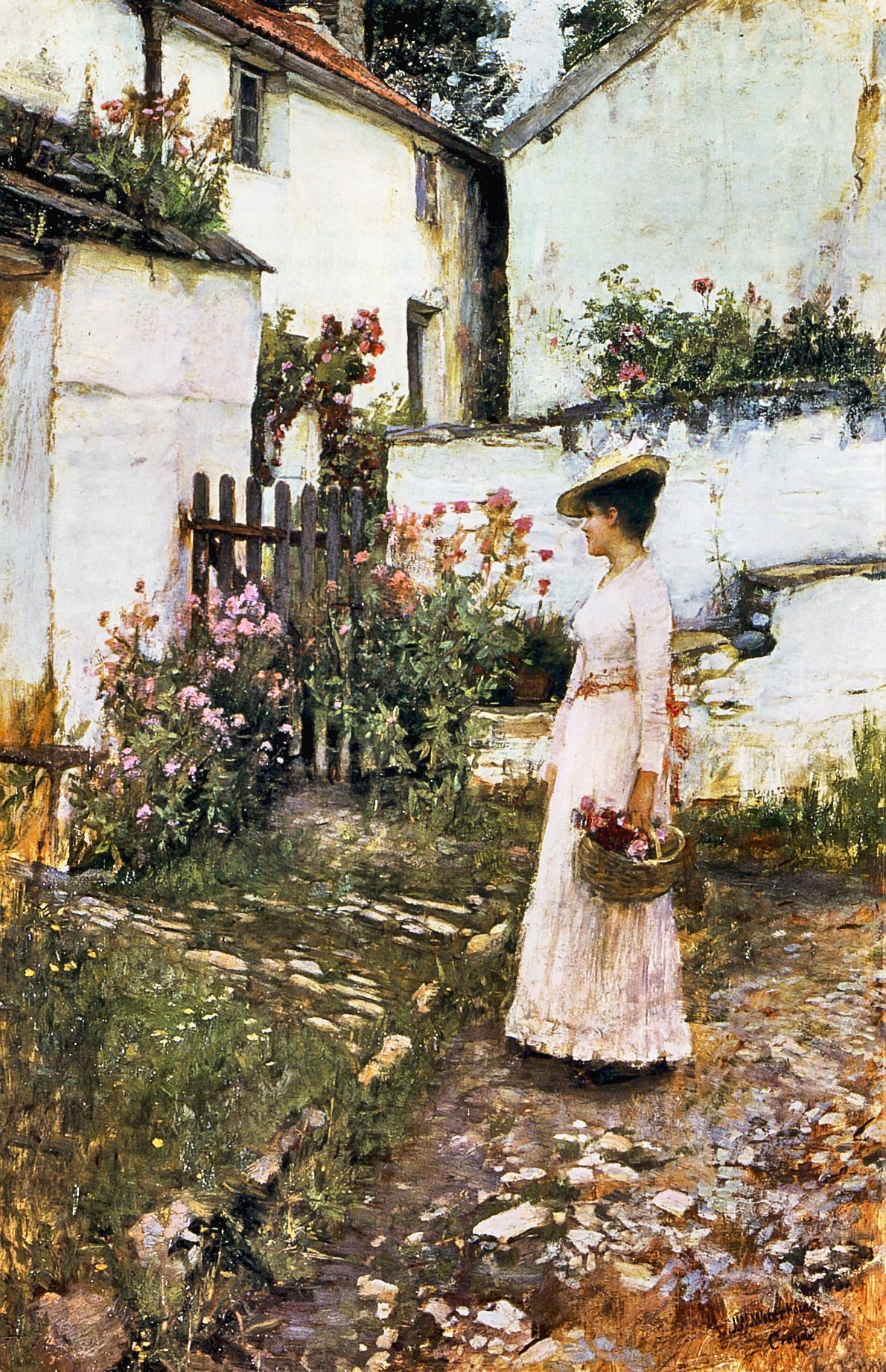
Gathering Summer Flowers in a Devonshire Garden
1892–1893

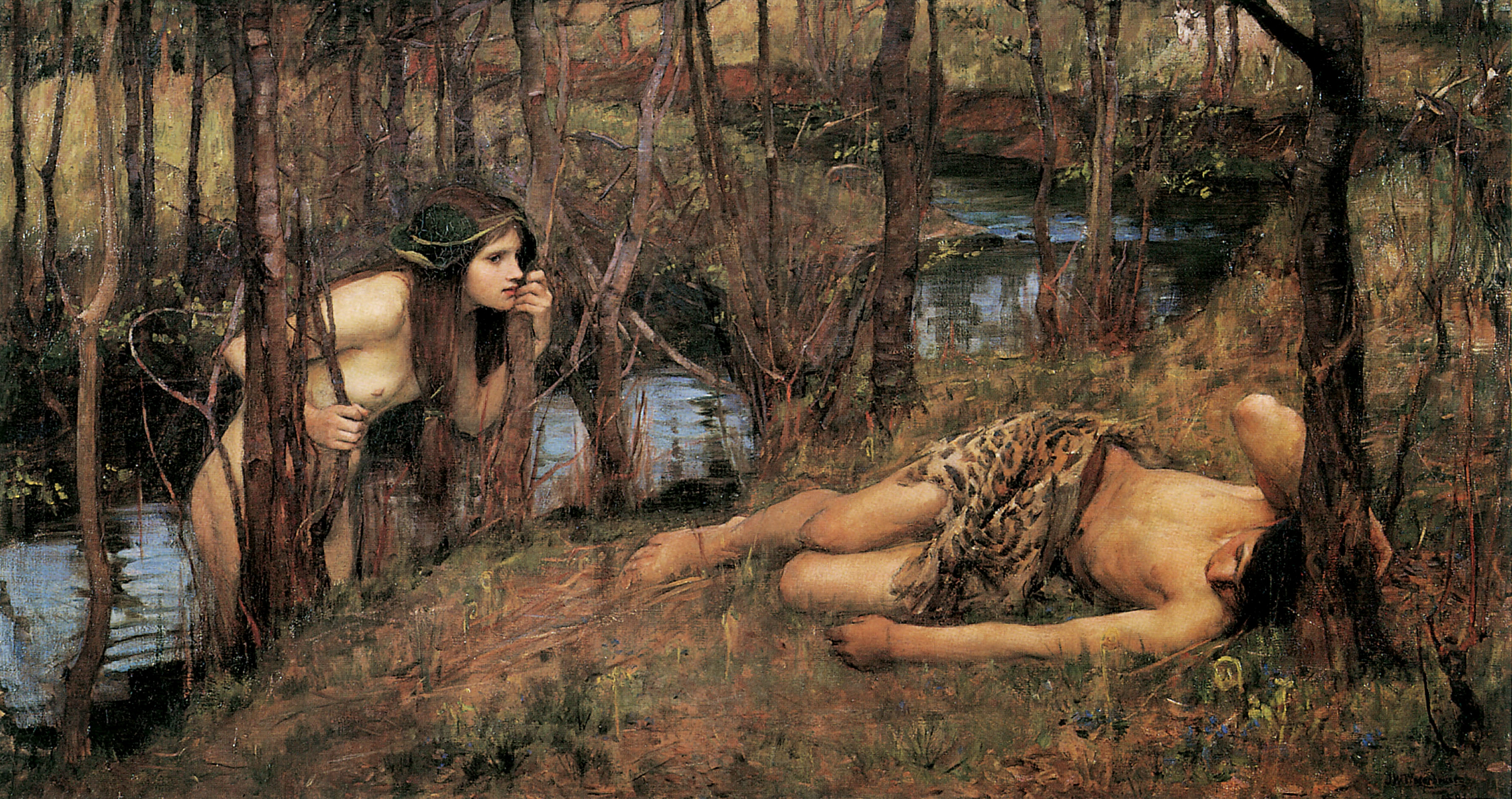
A Naiad or Hylas with a Nymph
1893

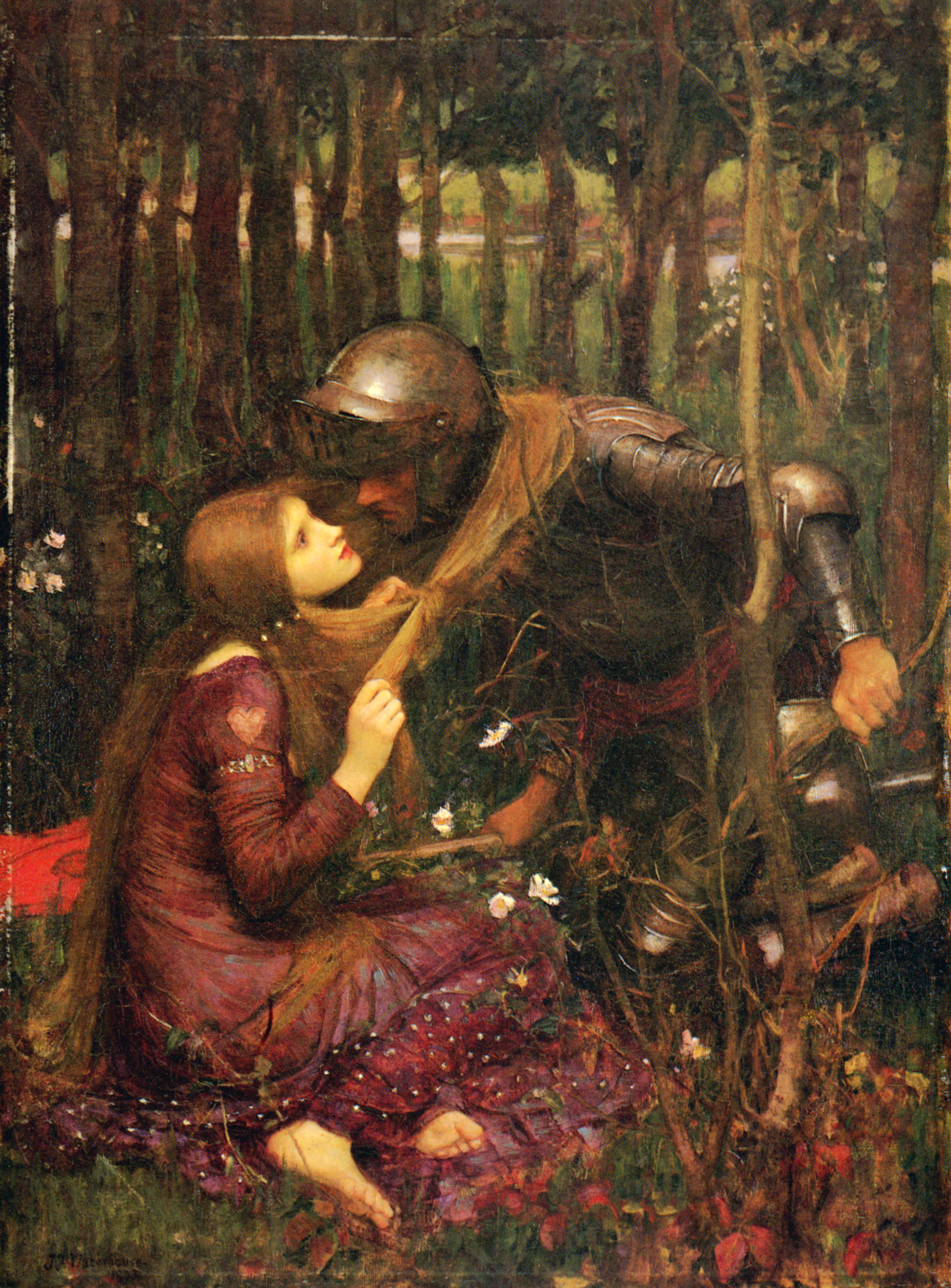
La Belle Dame sans Merci
1893

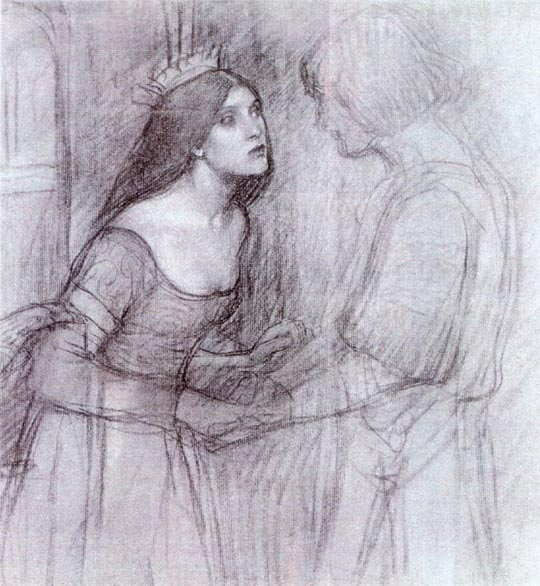
A Female Study
1894

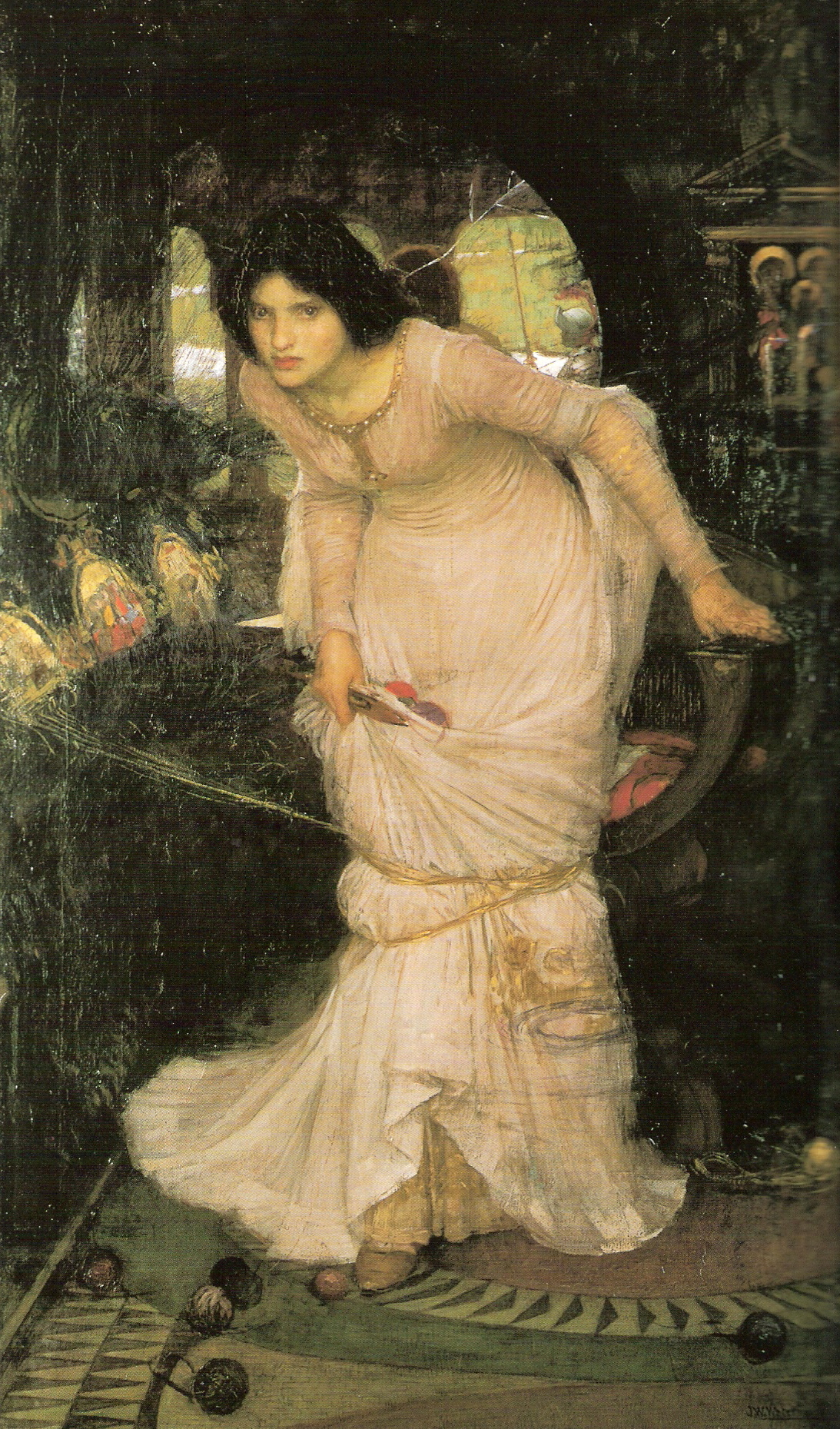
The Lady of Shalott Looking at Lancelot
1894

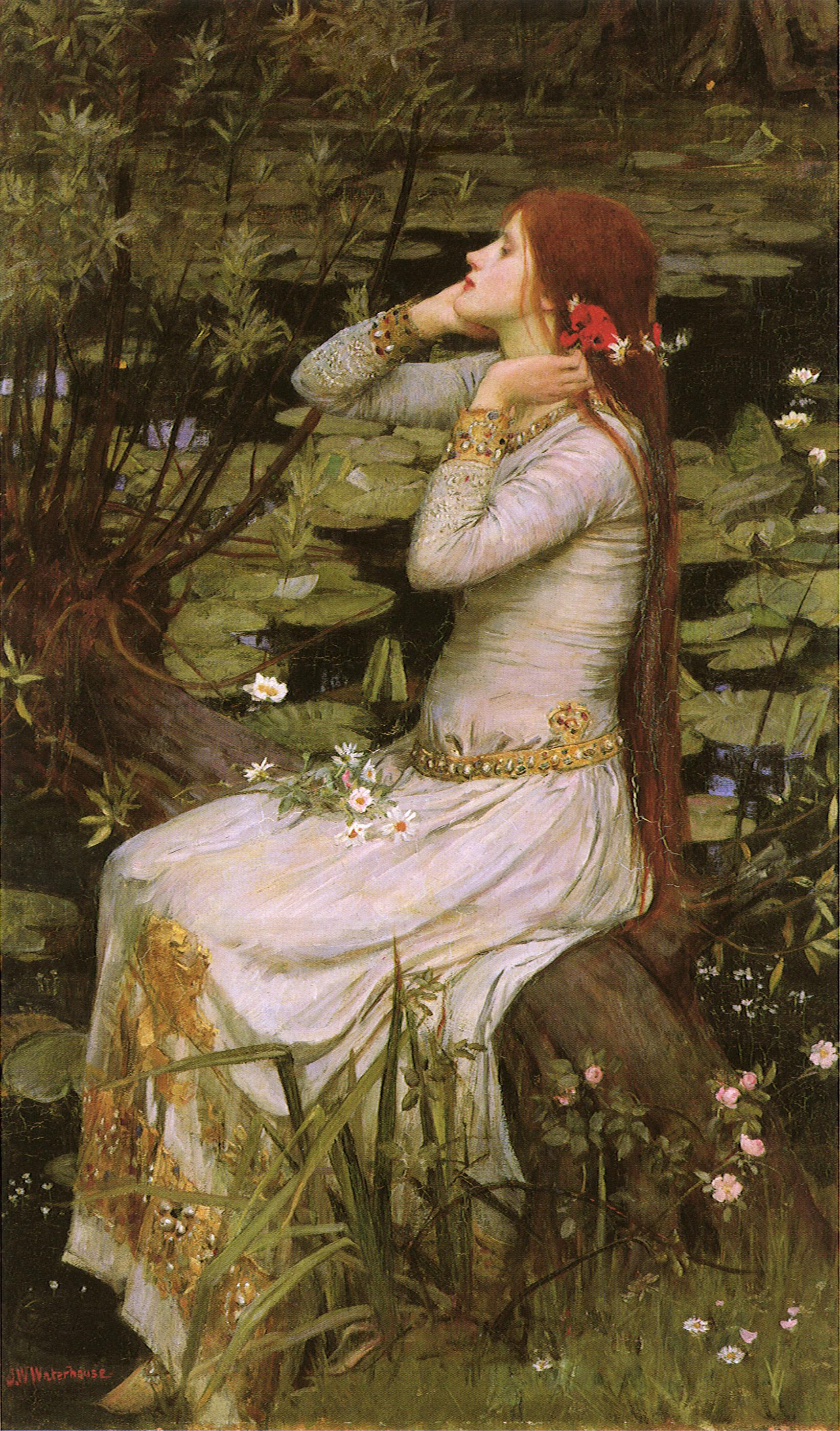
Ophelia
1894

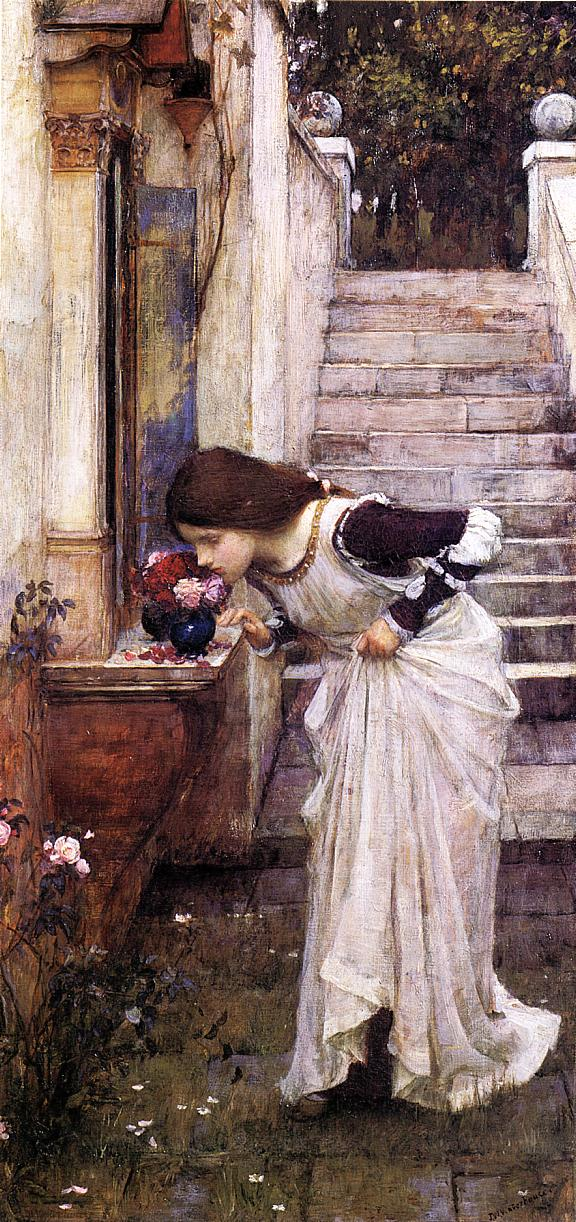
The Shrine
1895

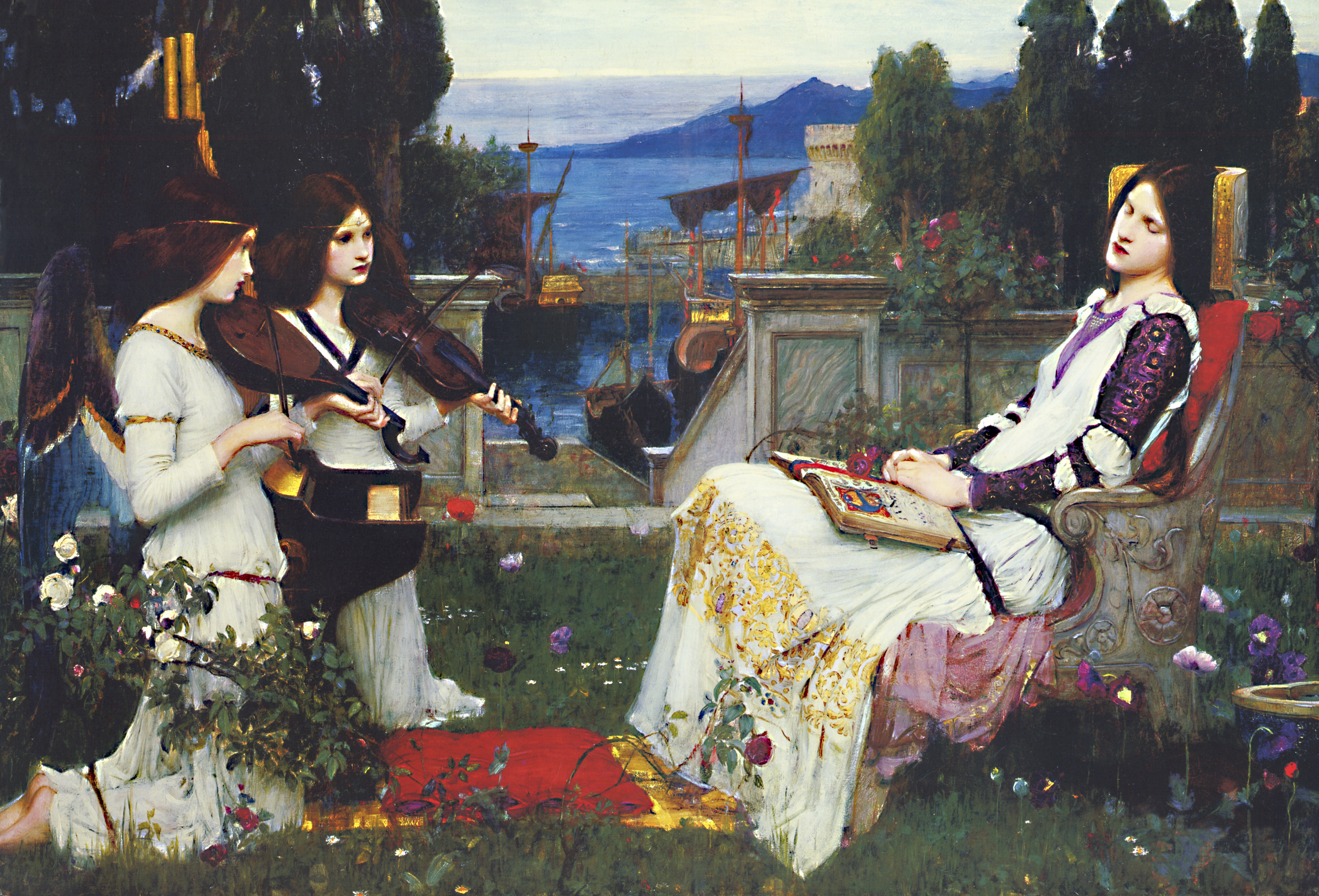
Saint Cecilia
1895

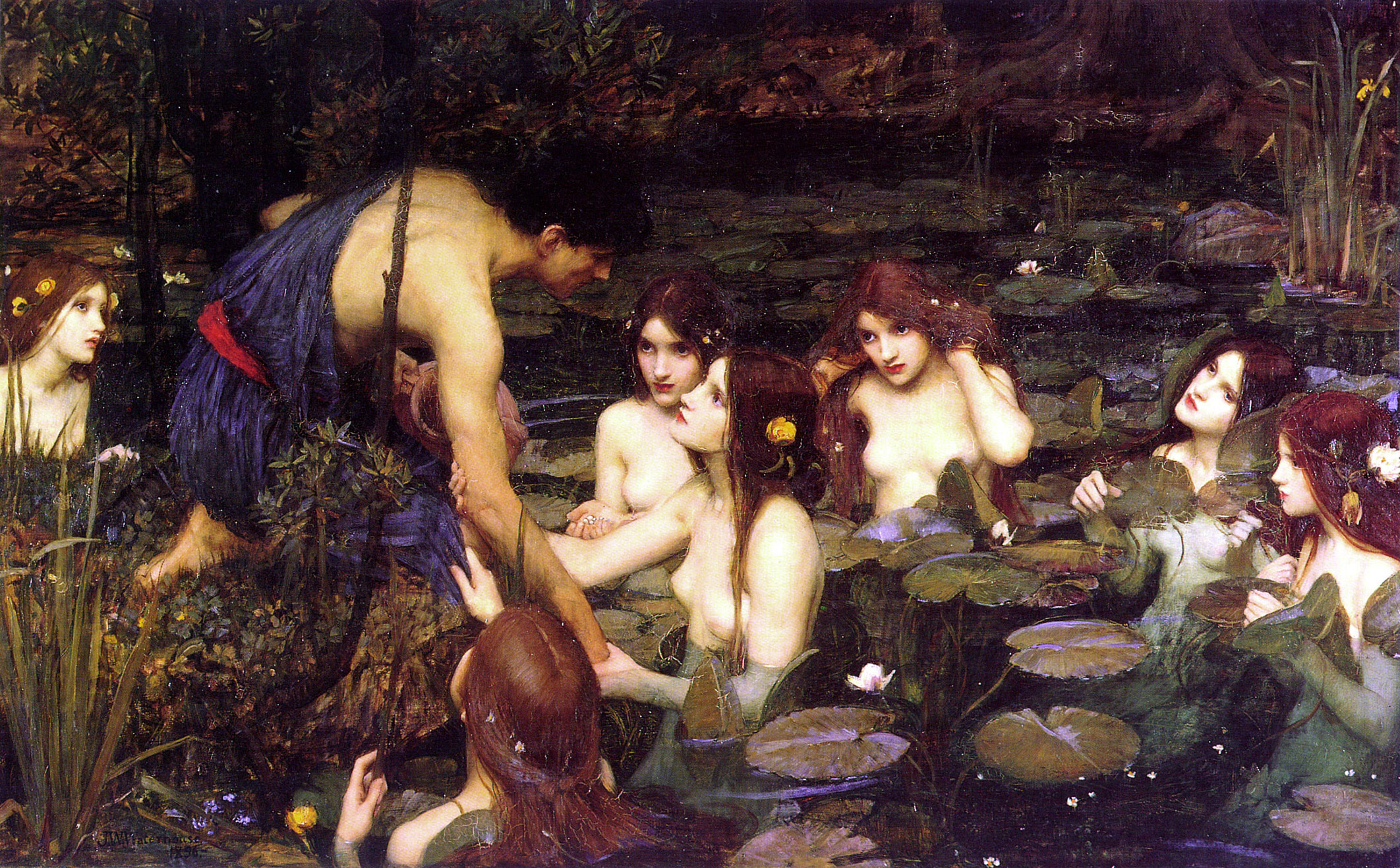
Hylas and the Nymphs
1896

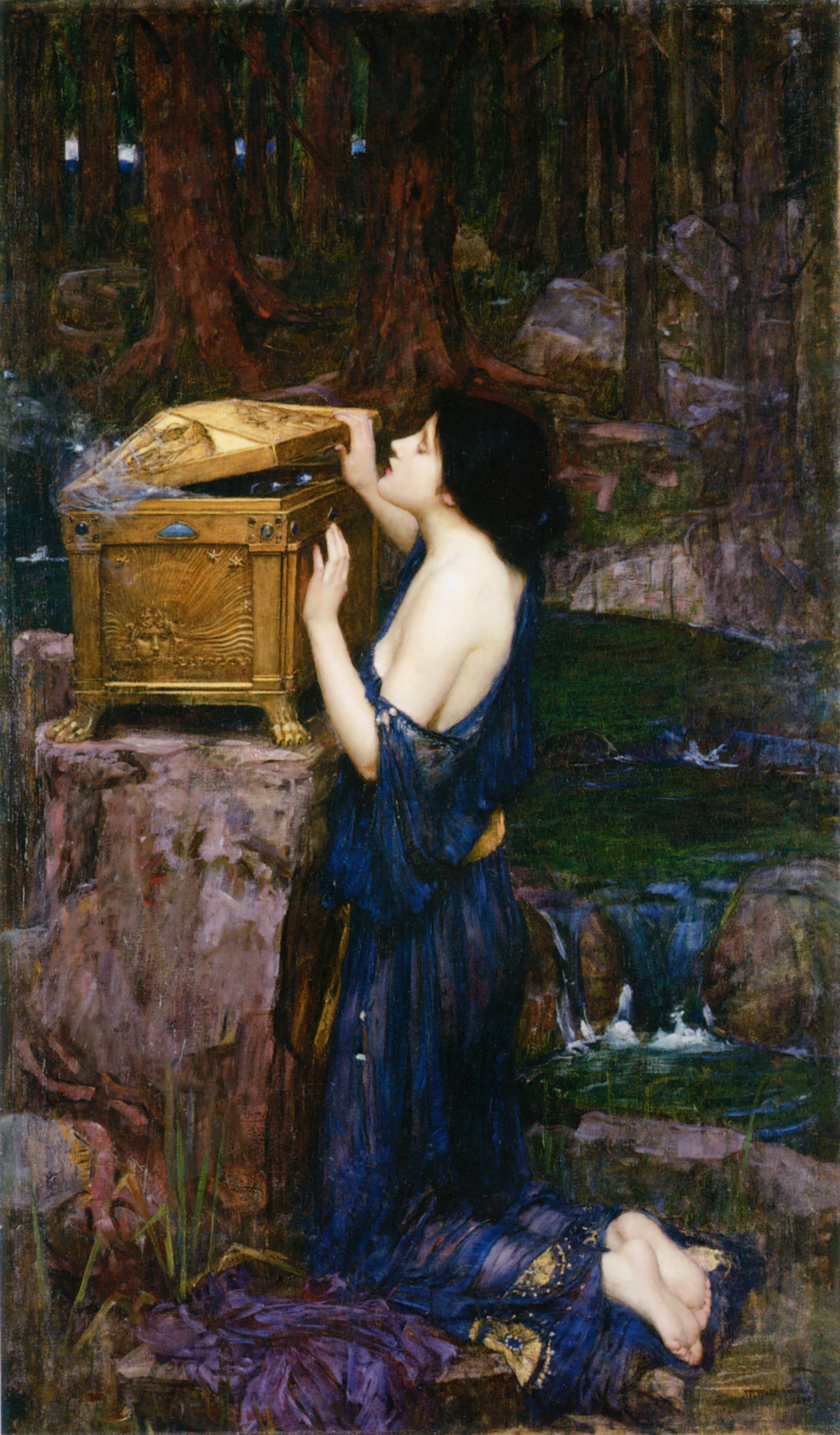
Pandora
1896

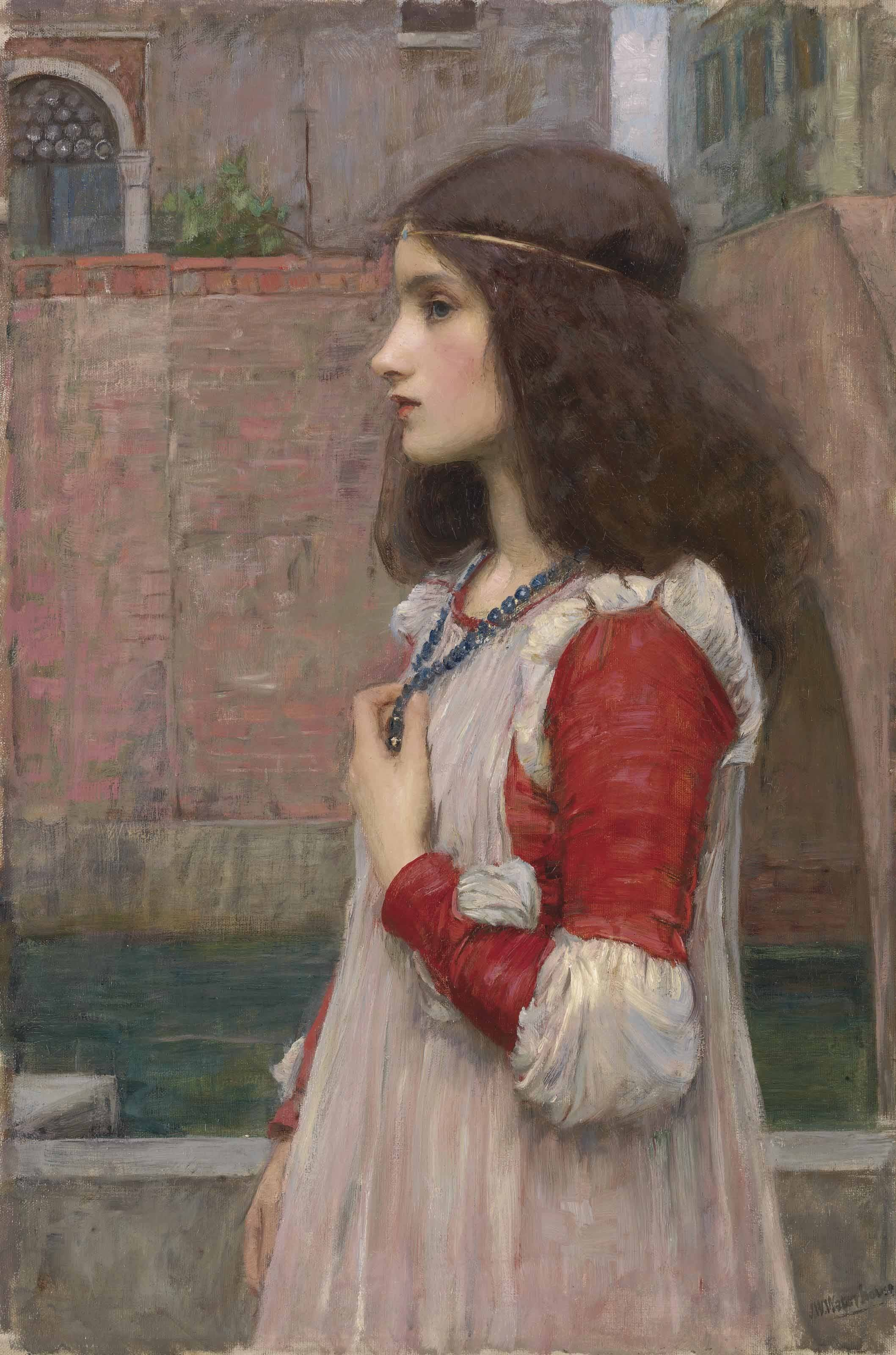
Juliet
1898

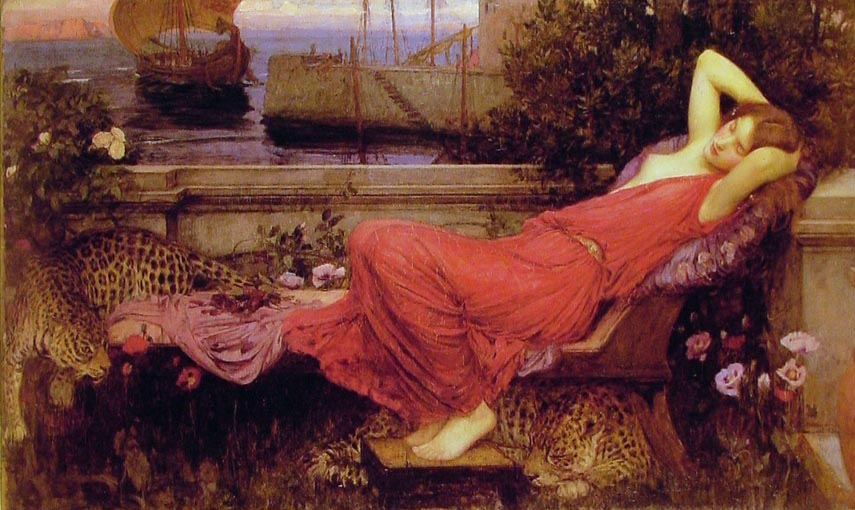
Ariadne
1898

=== 1900s ===
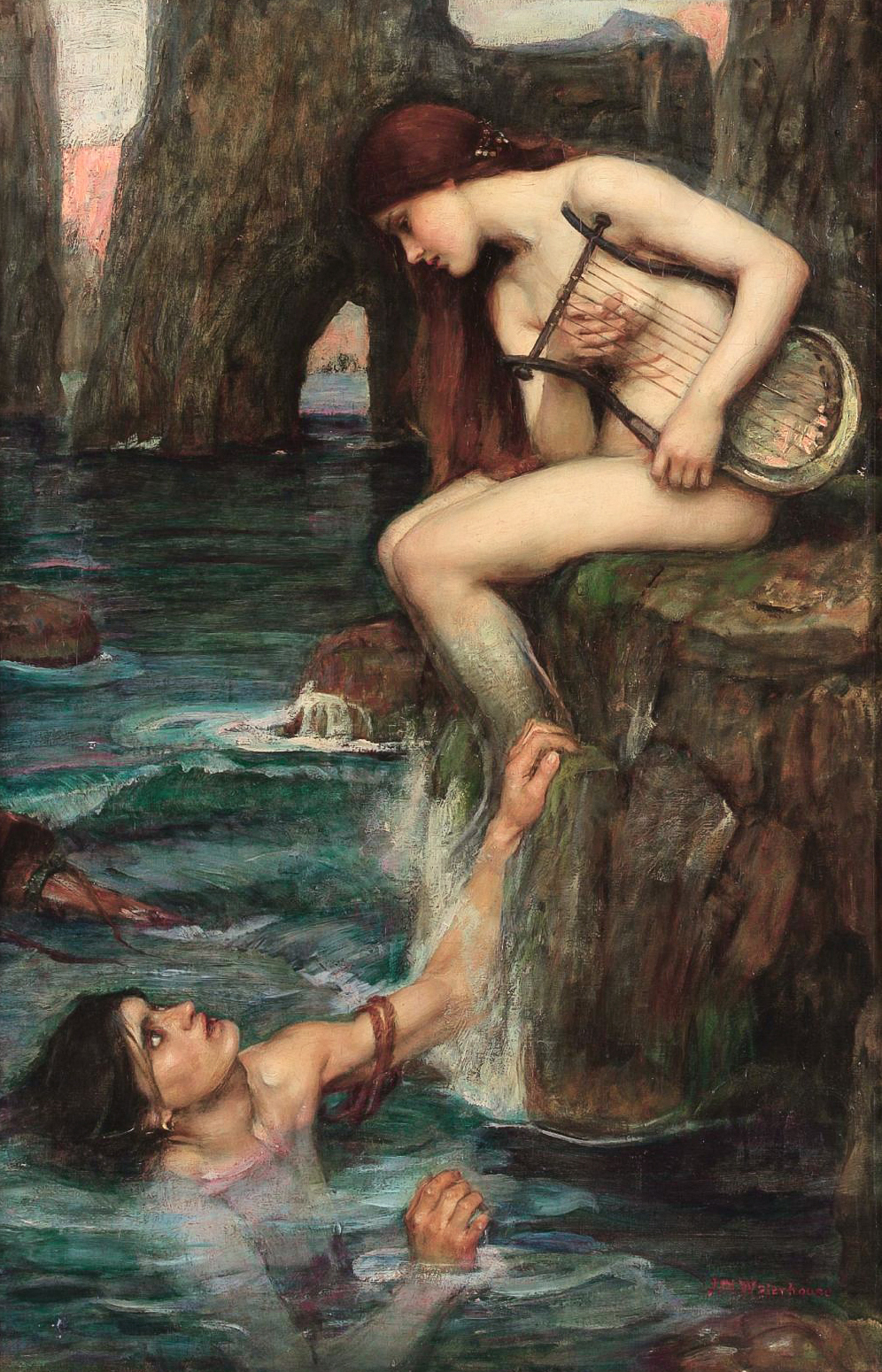
The Siren
1900

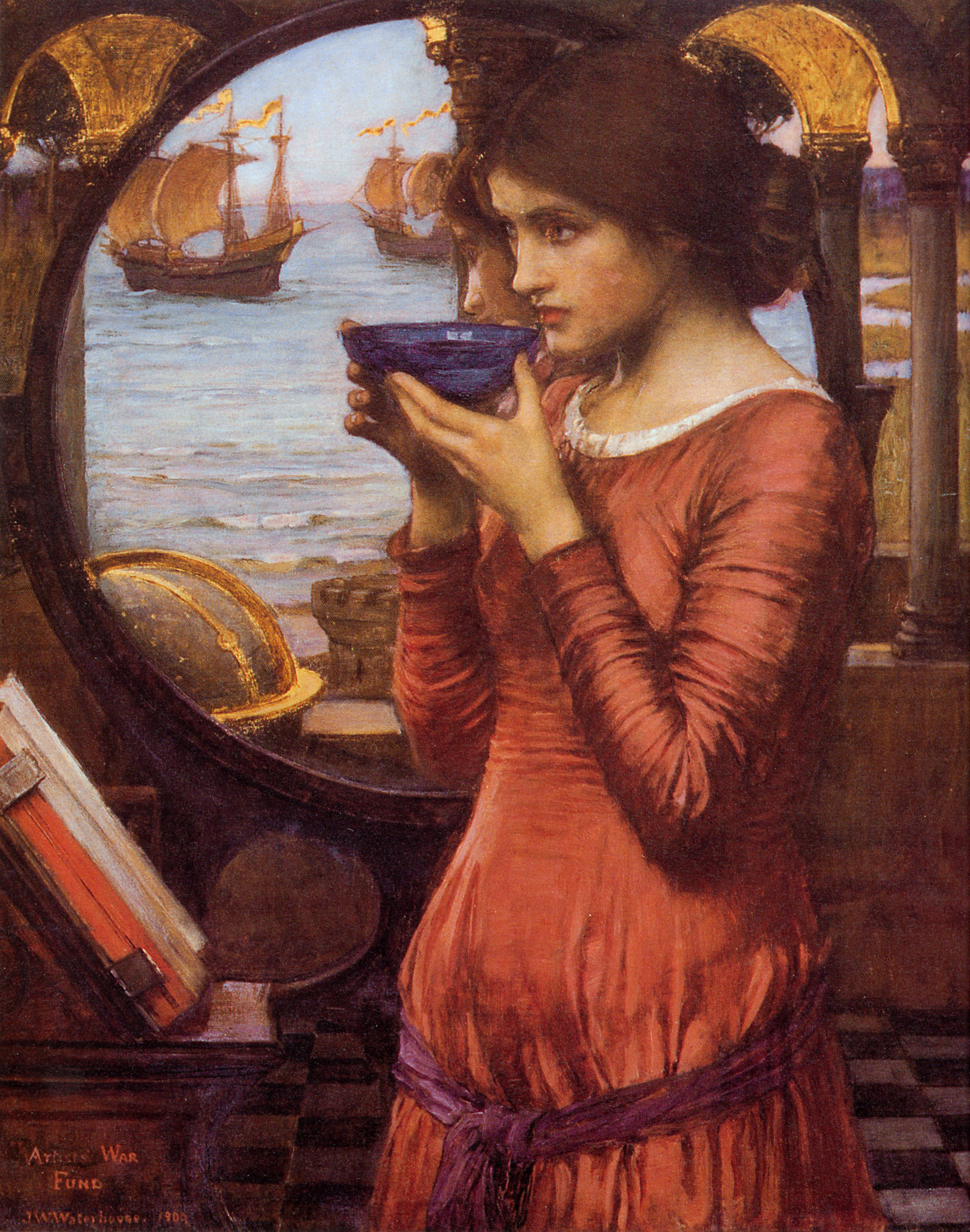
Destiny
1900

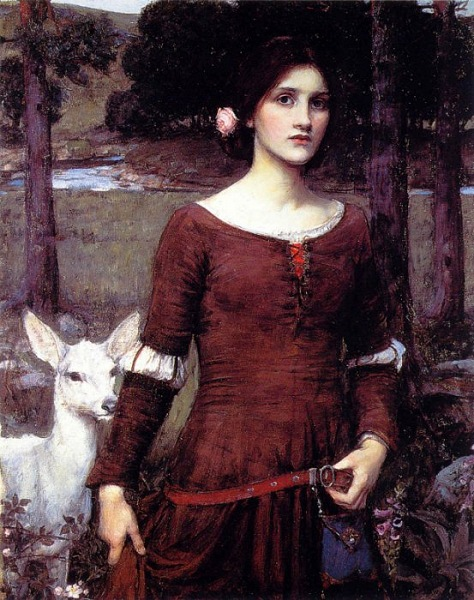
The Lady Clare
1900

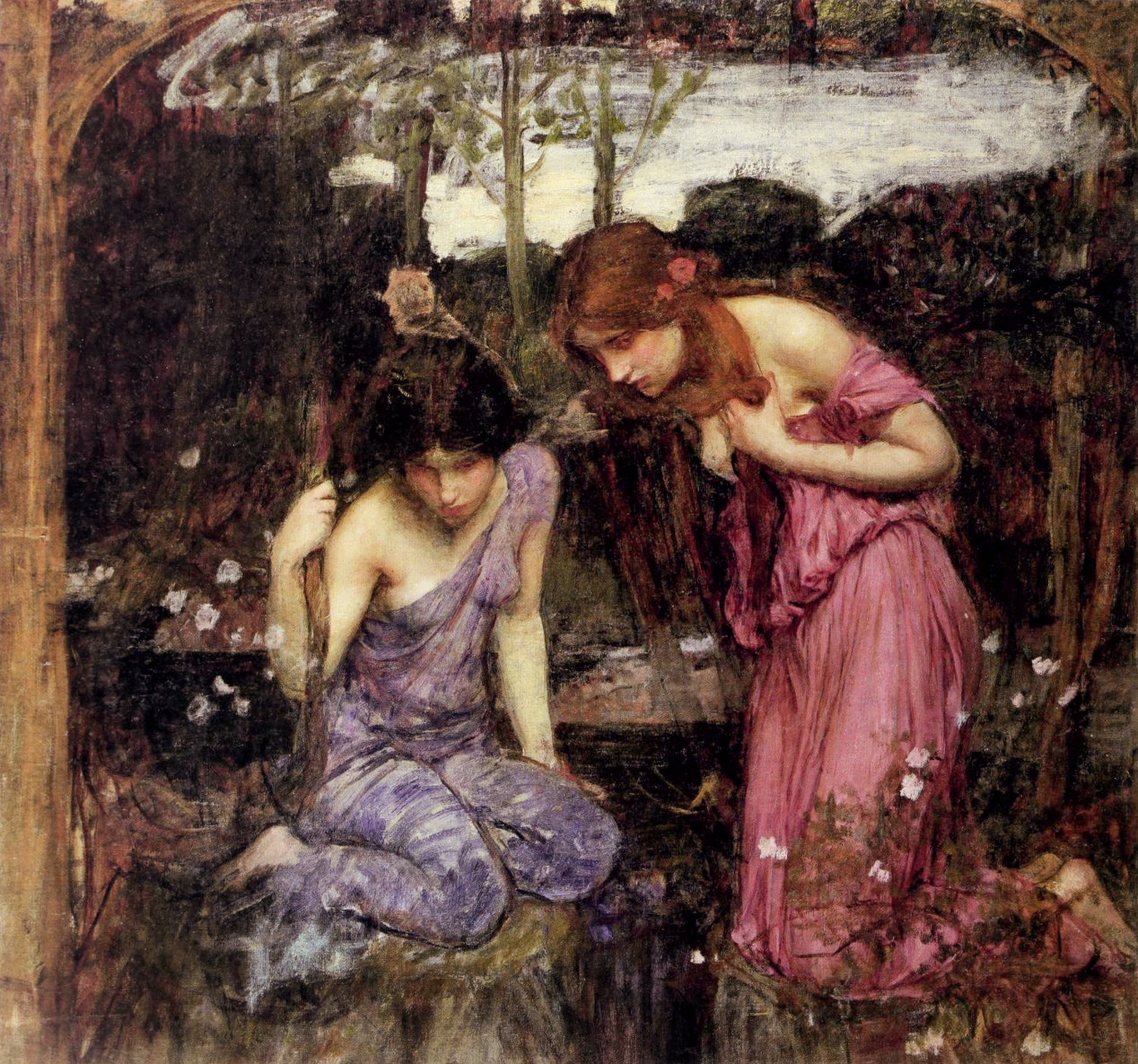
Study for Nymphs Finding the Head of Orpheus
1900

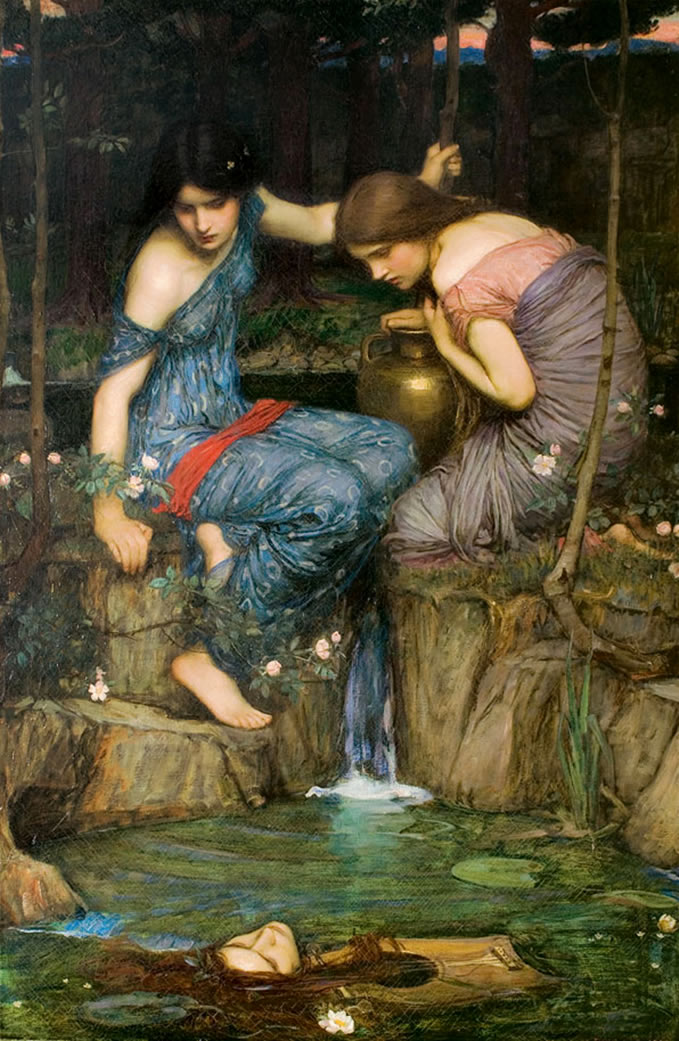
Nymphs Finding the Head of Orpheus
1900

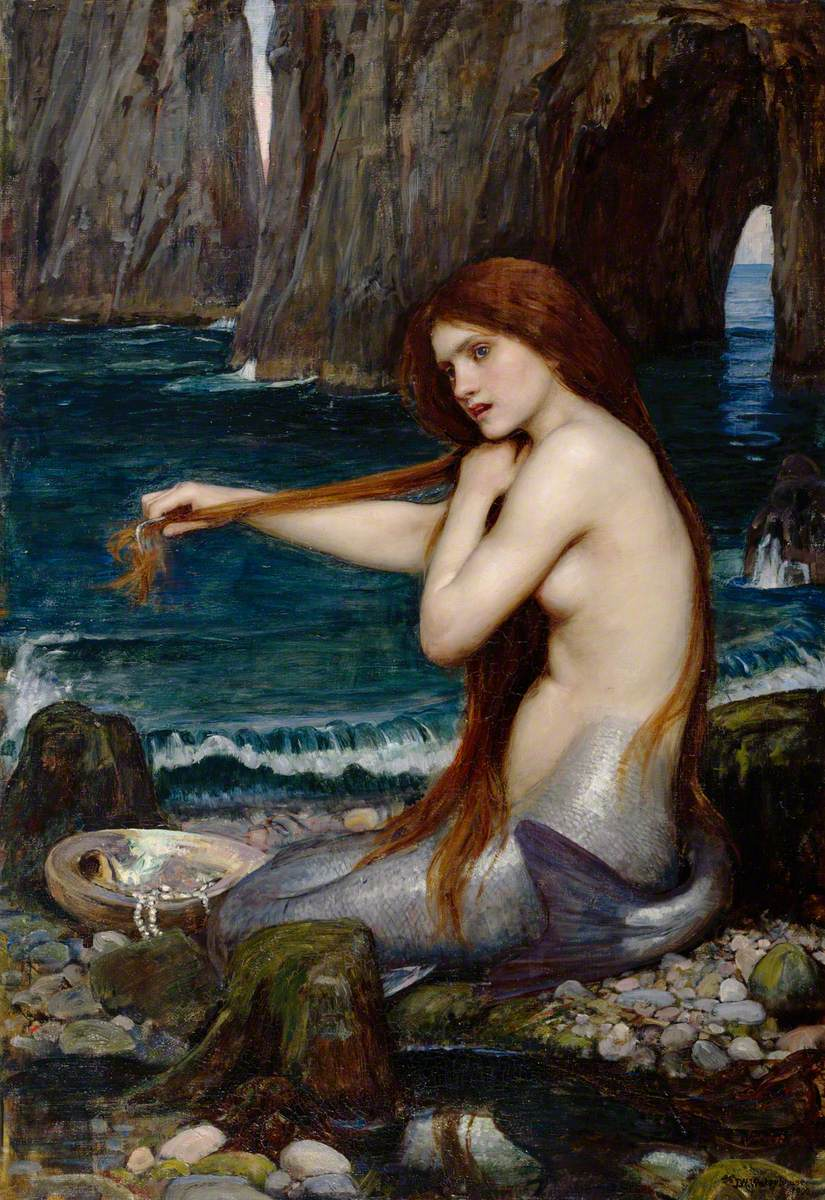
A Mermaid
1901

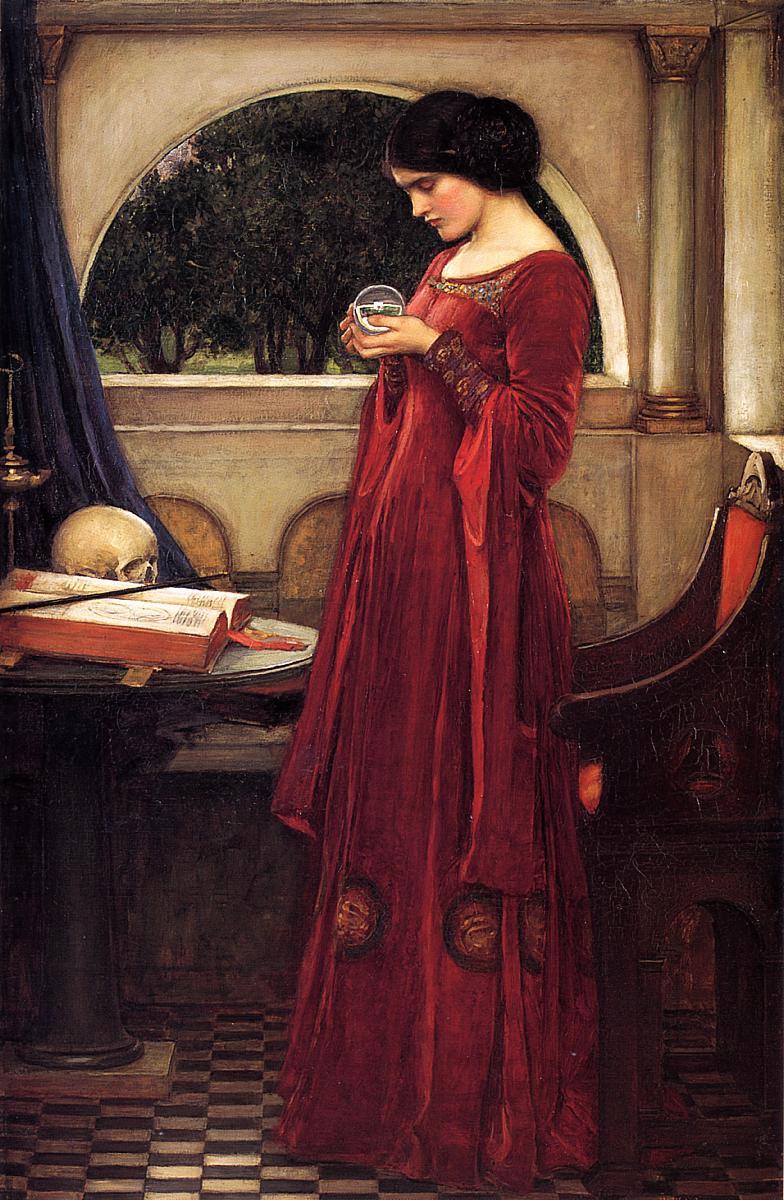
The Crystal Ball
1902

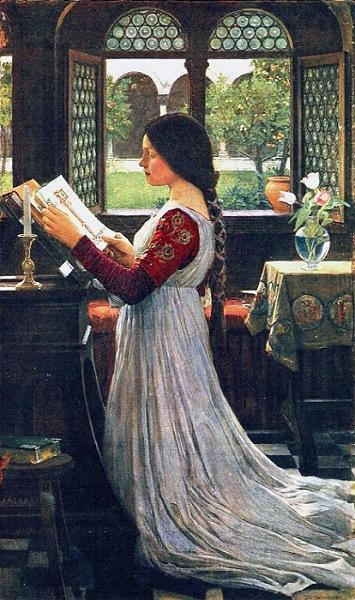
The Missal
1902

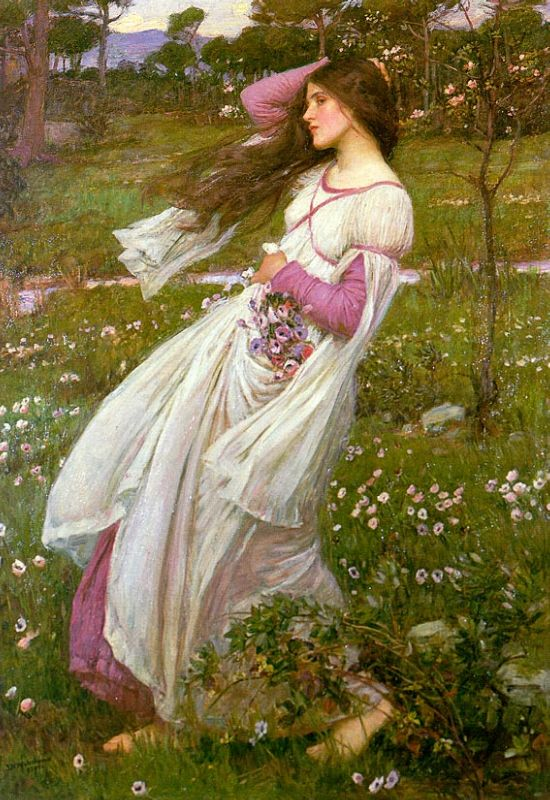
Windflowers
1902

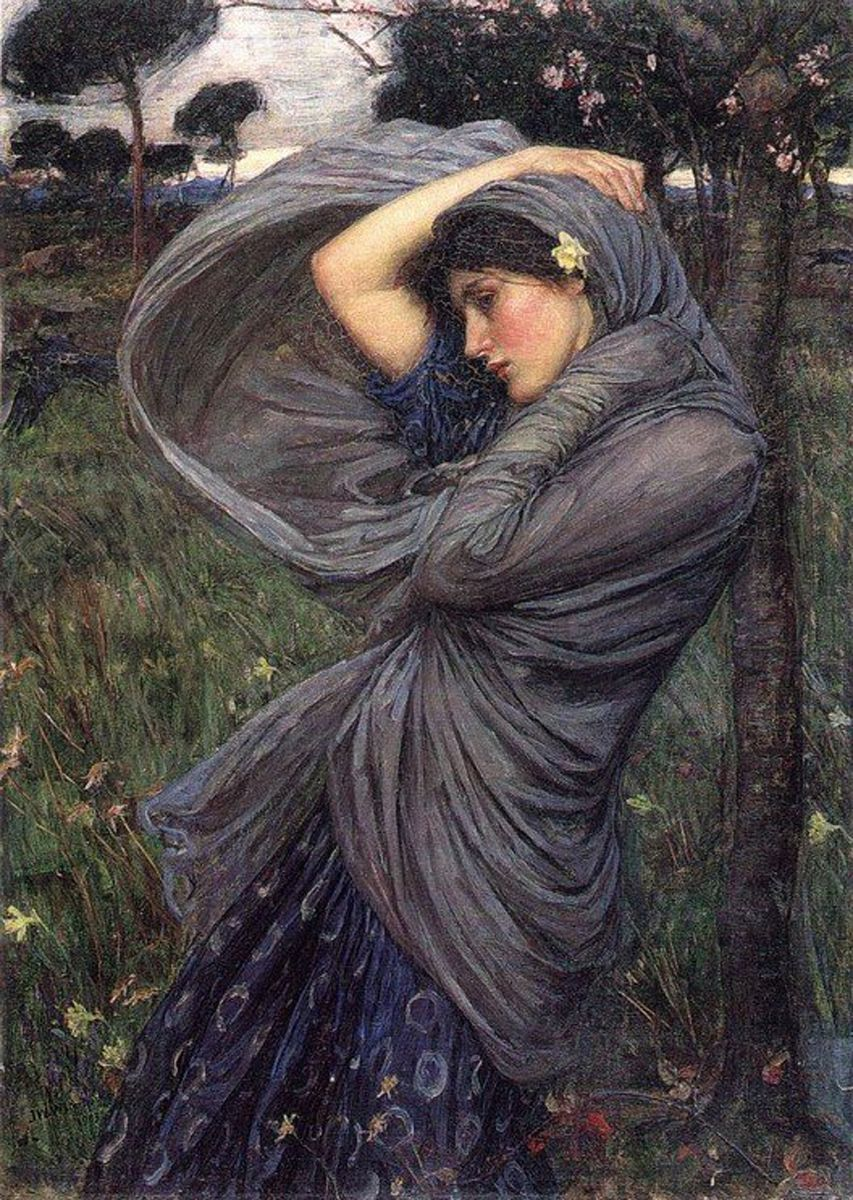
Boreas
1903

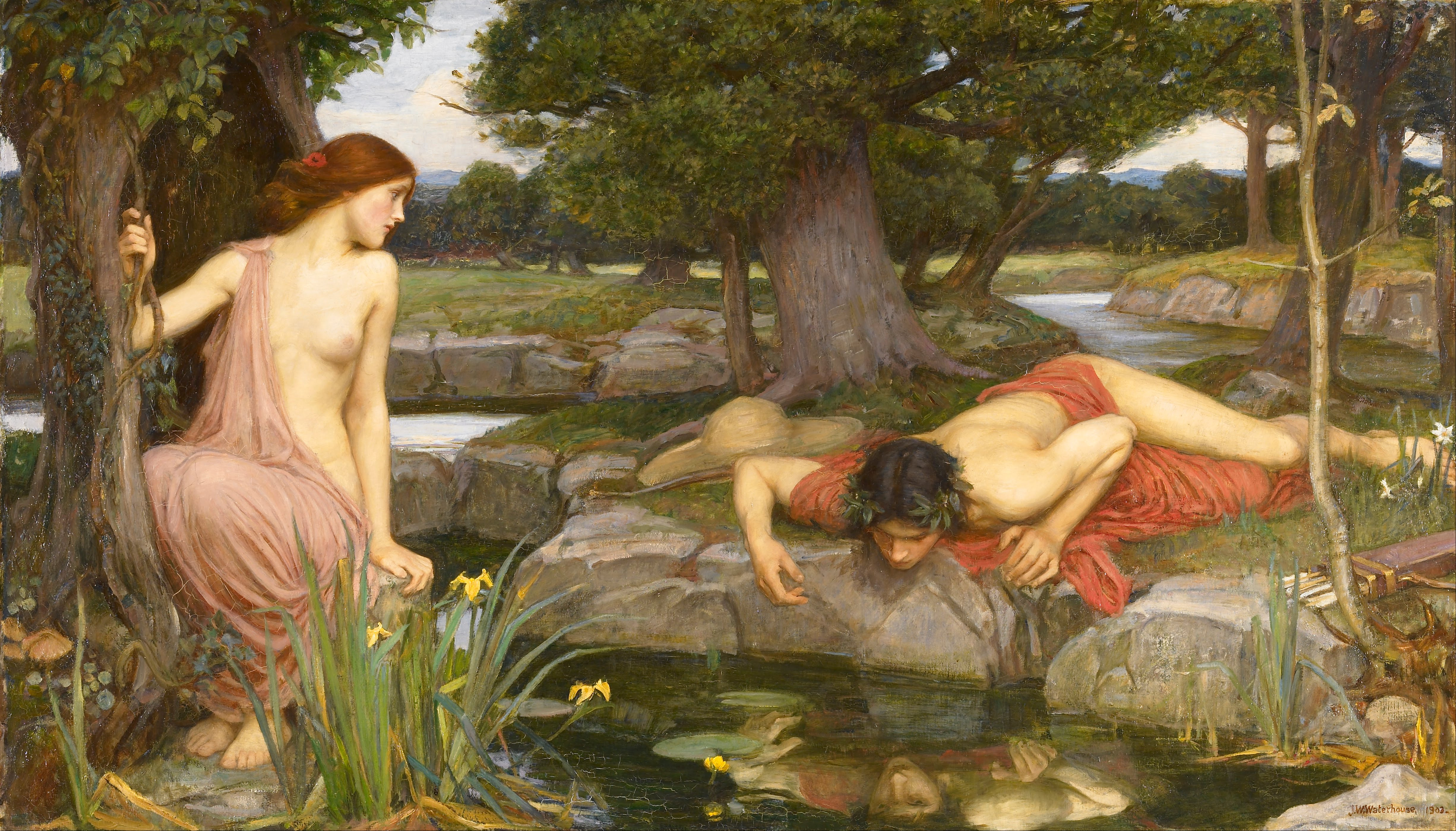
Echo and Narcissus
1903

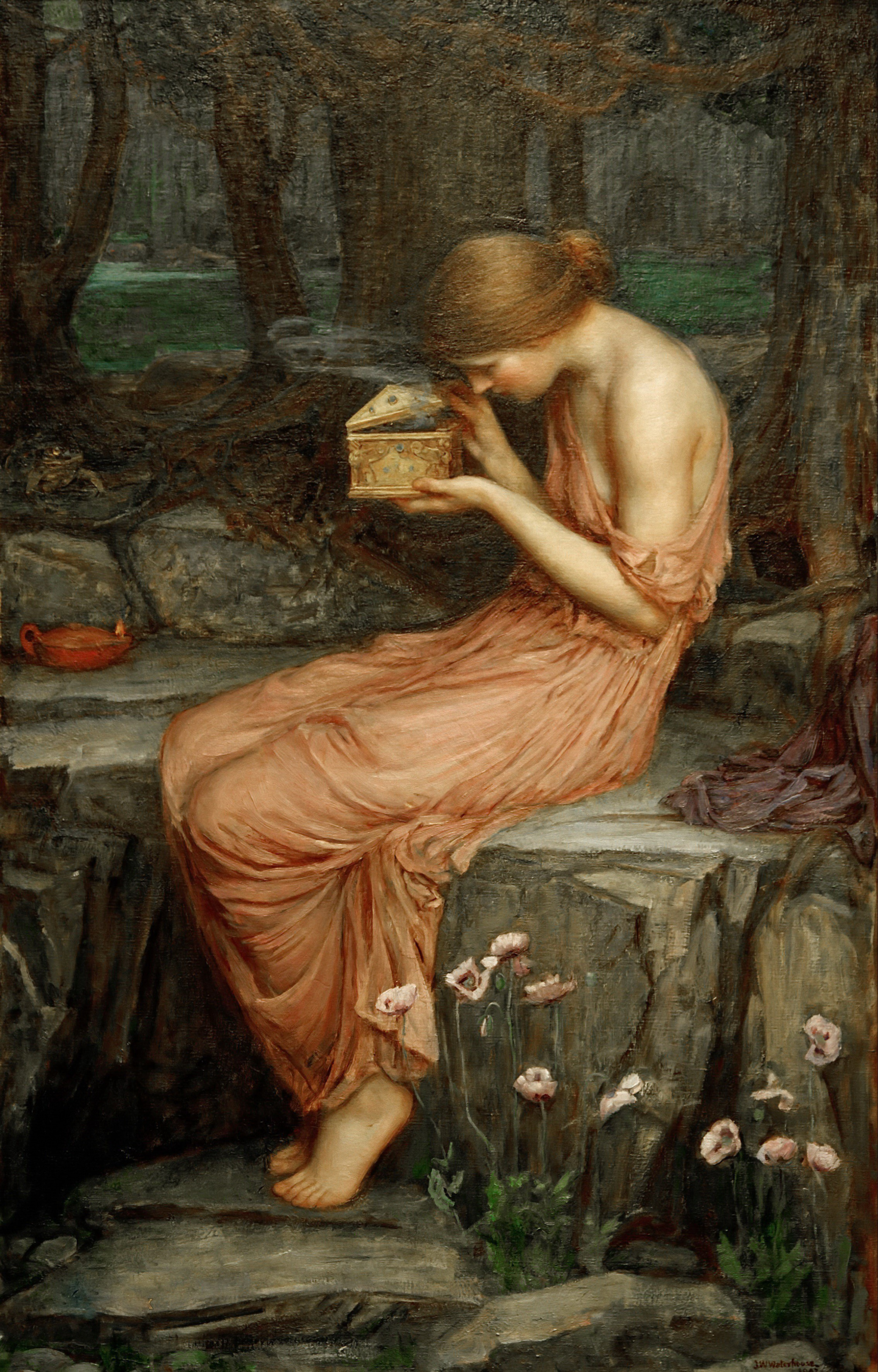
Psyche Opening the Golden Box
1903

Psyche Opening the Door into Cupid's Garden
1904

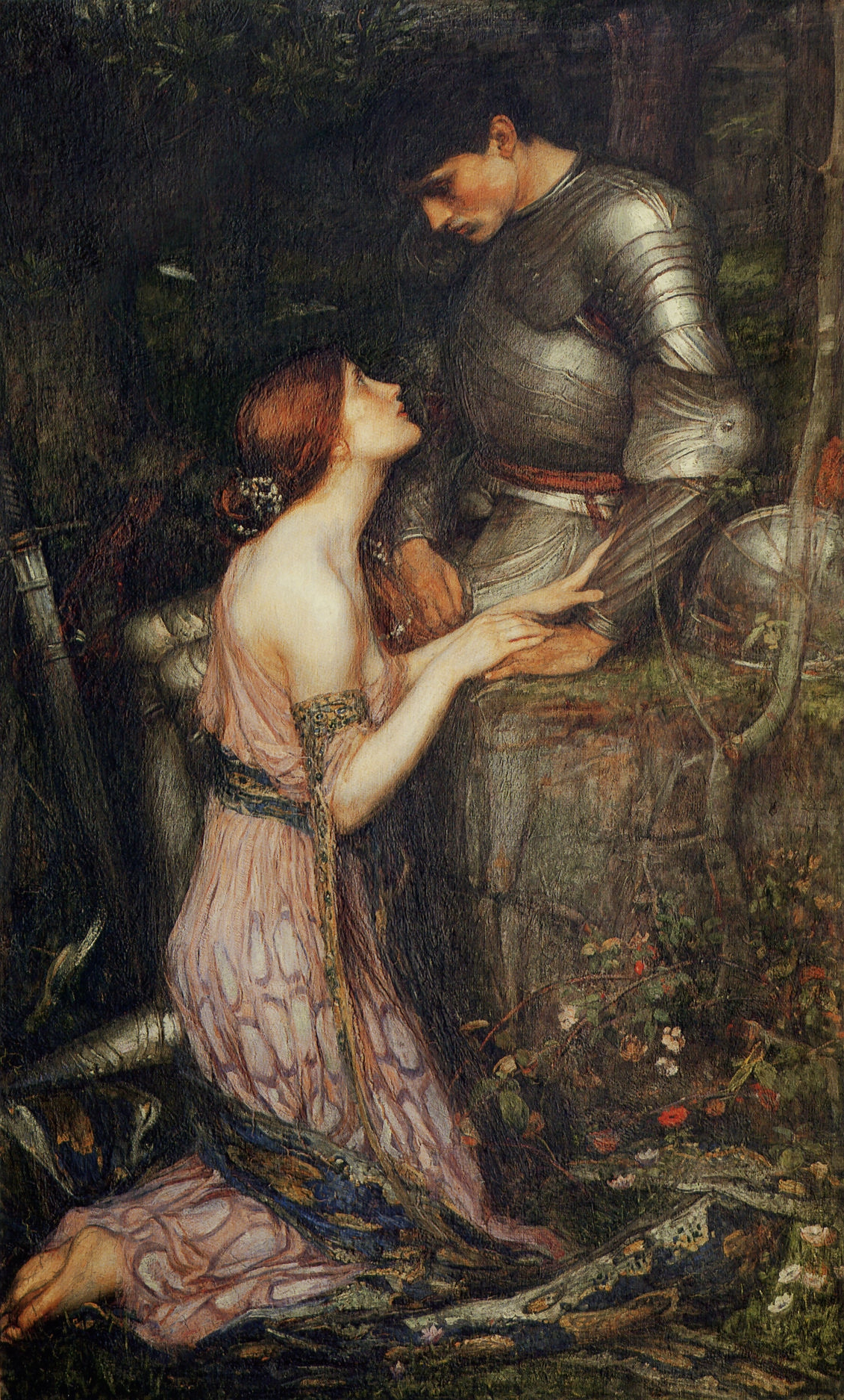
Lamia
(version 1)
1905

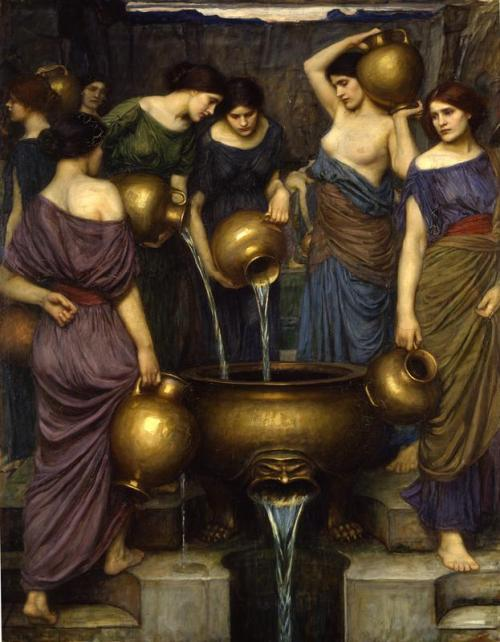
The Danaides, 1906

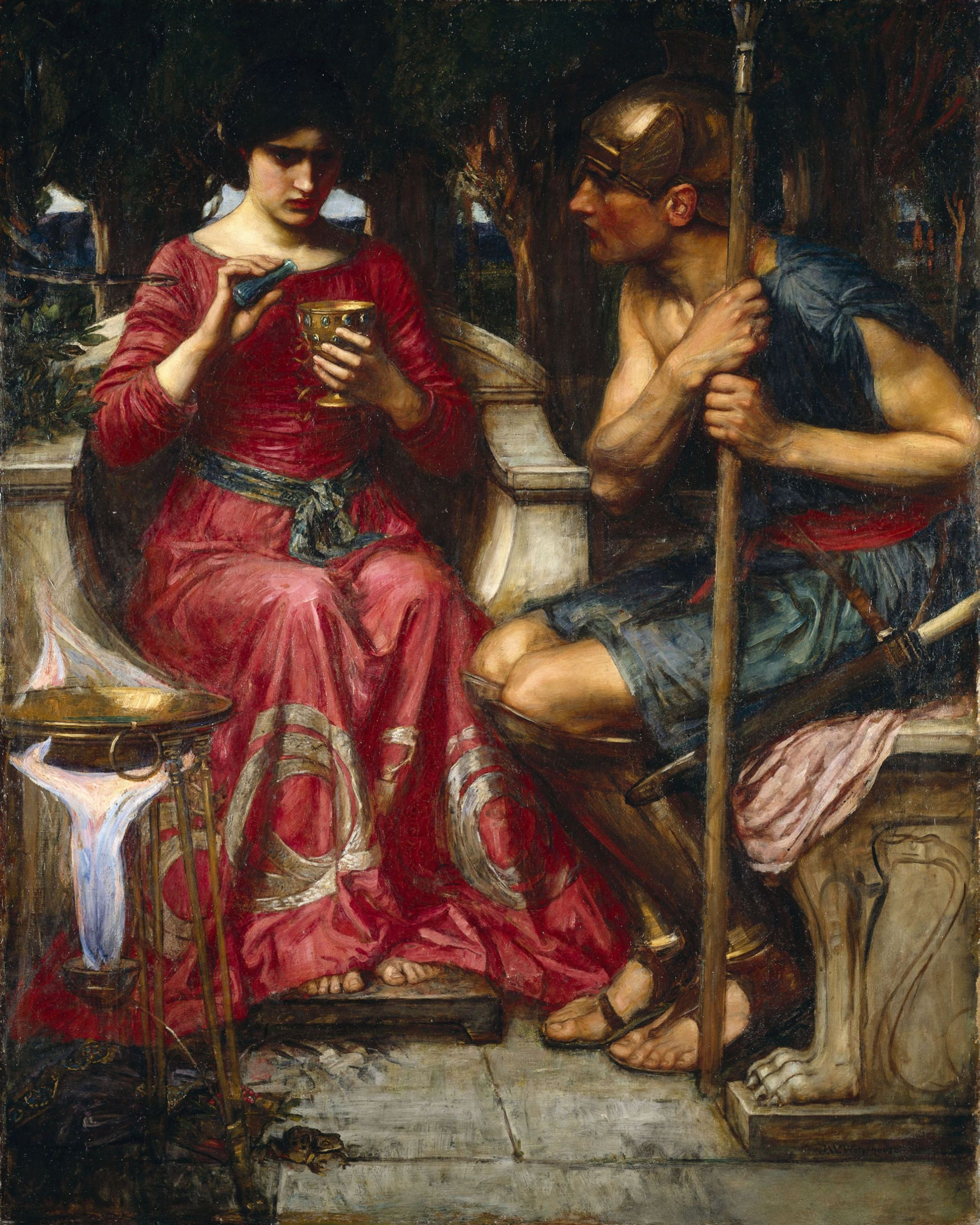
Jason and Medea
1907

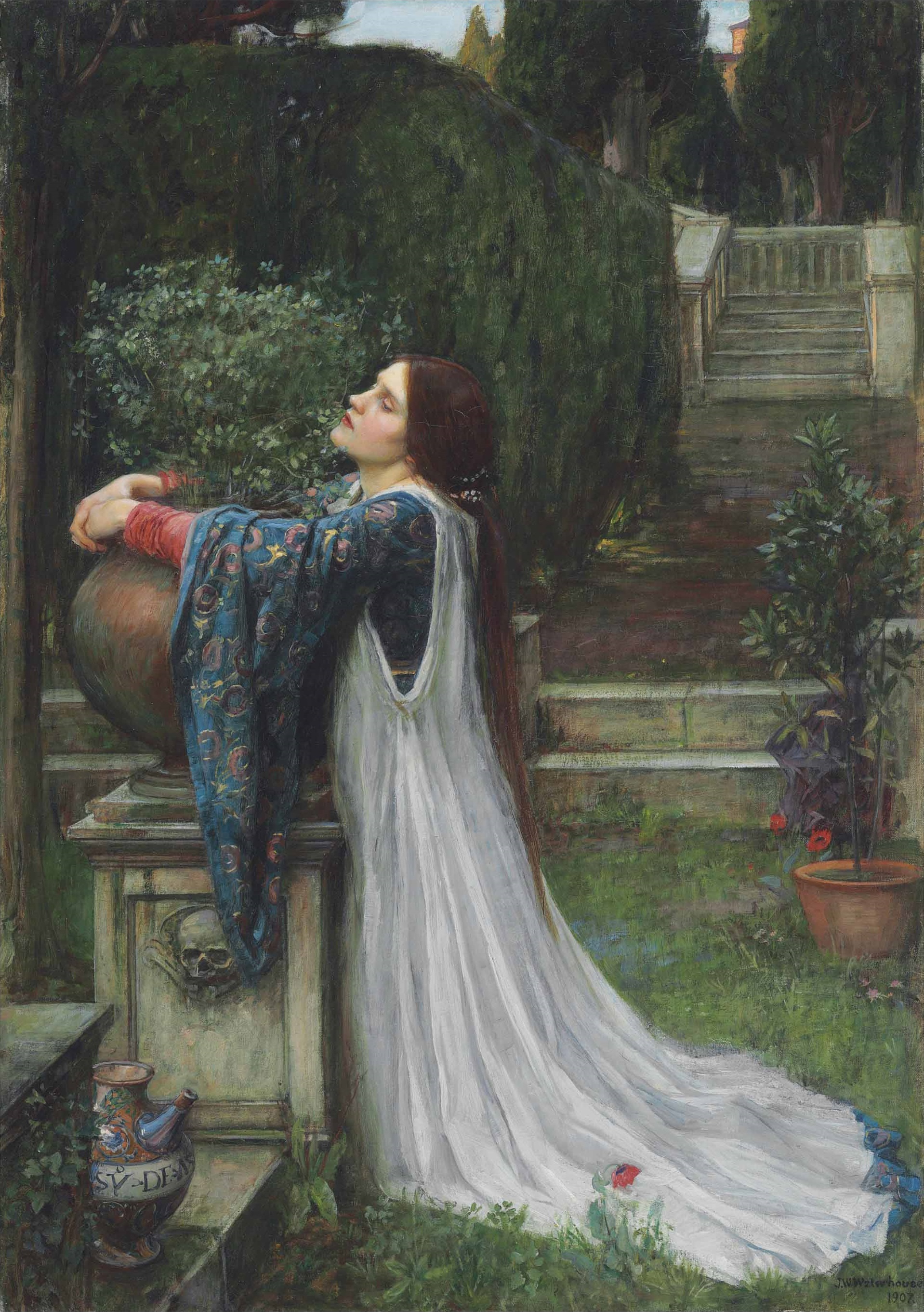
Isabella and the pot of basil
1907

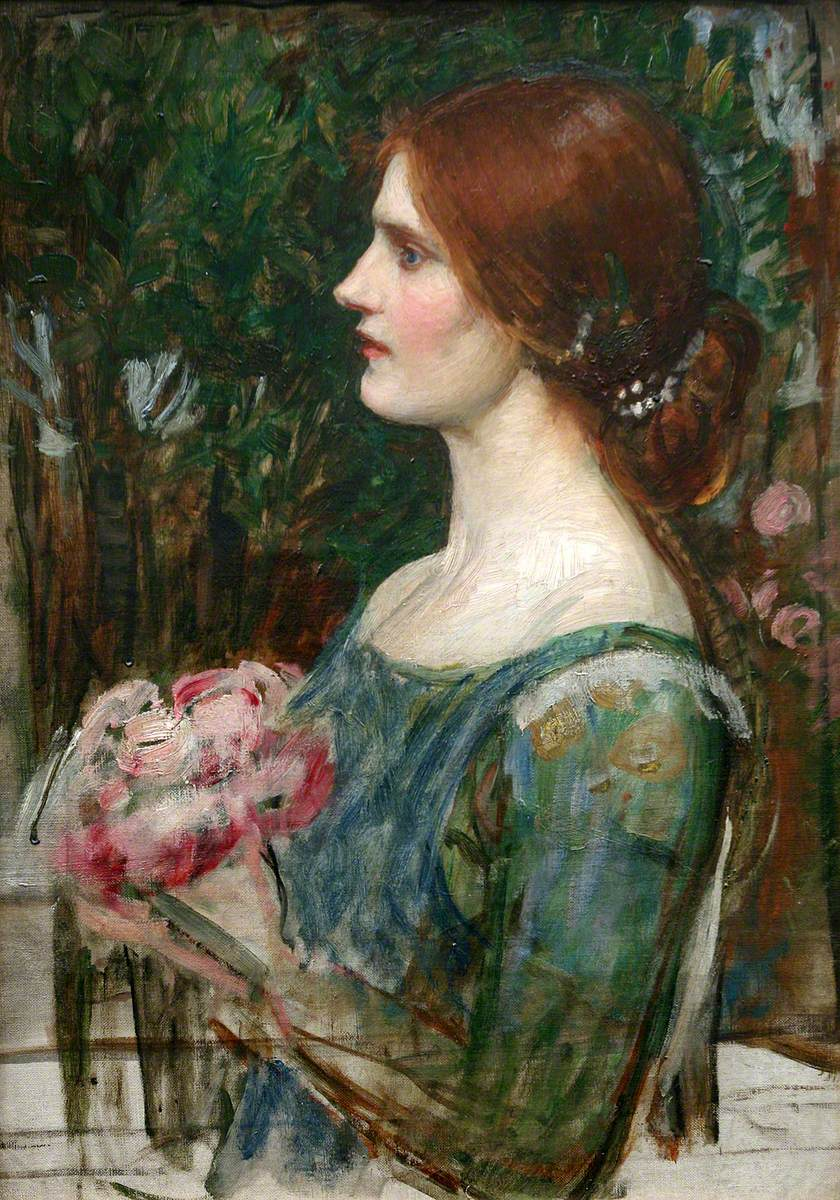
The Bouquet
(a study)
1908

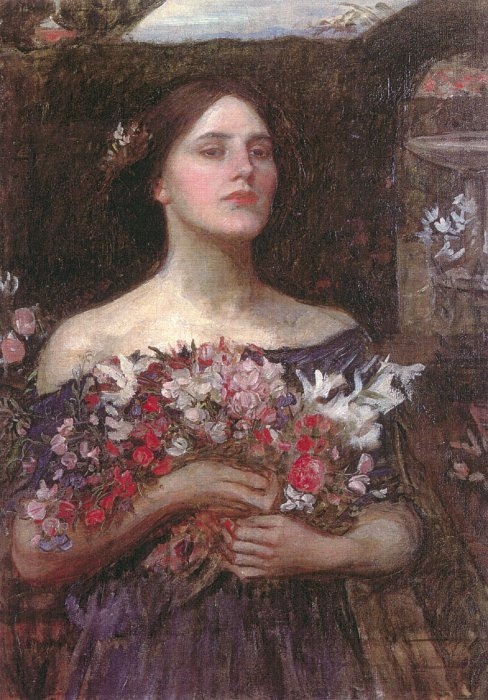
Gather Ye Rosebuds or Ophelia (a study)
c. 1908

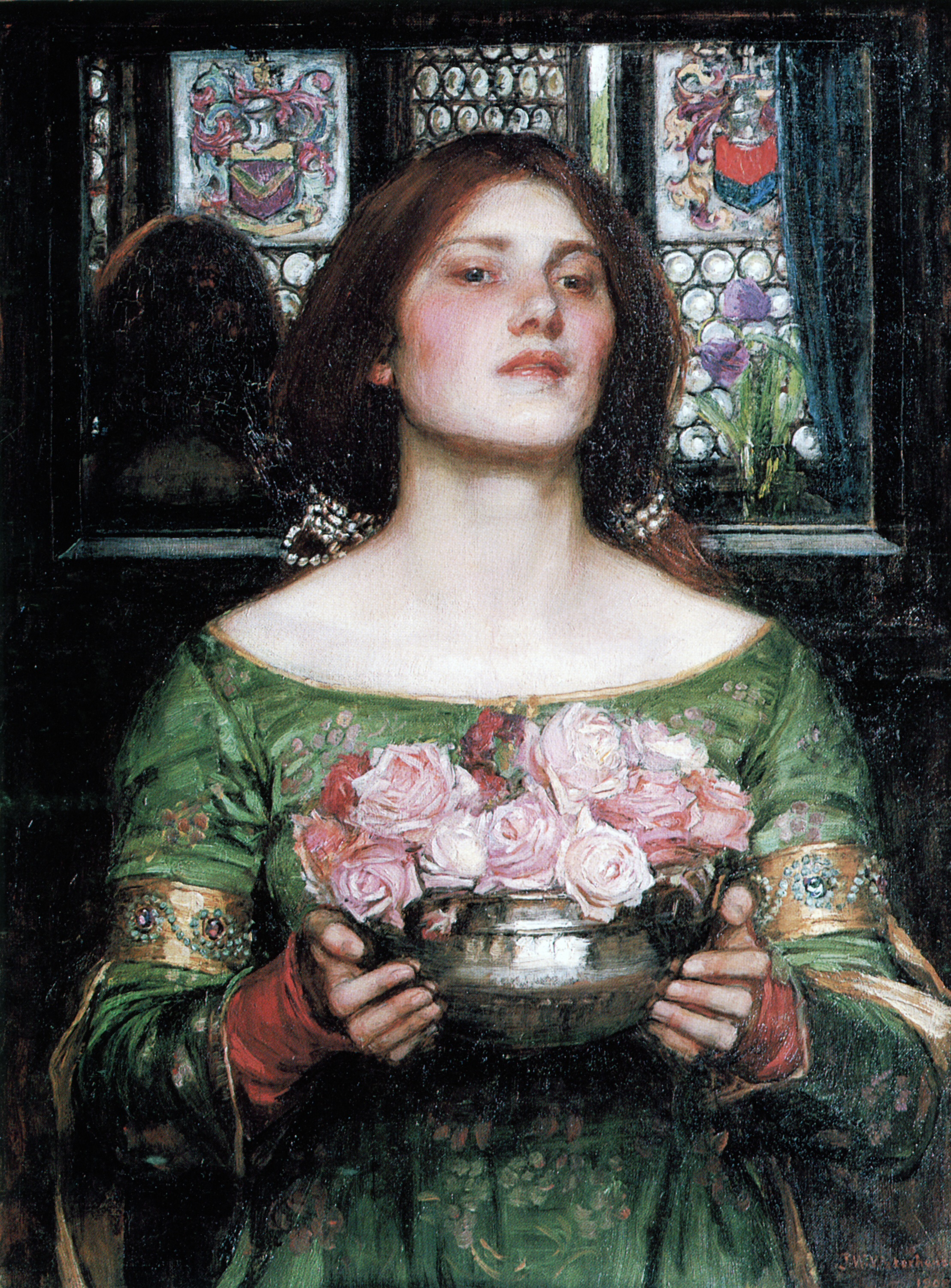
Gather Ye Rosebuds While Ye May…
1908

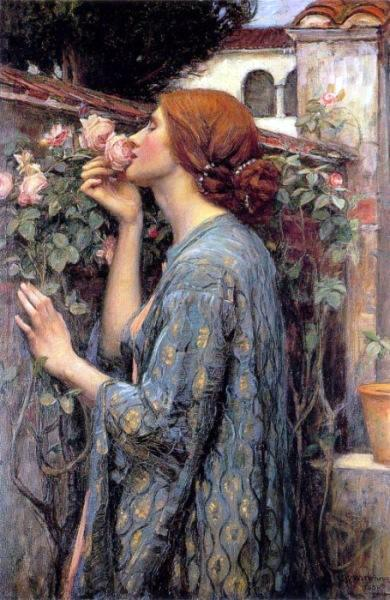
The Soul of the Rose or My Sweet Rose
1908

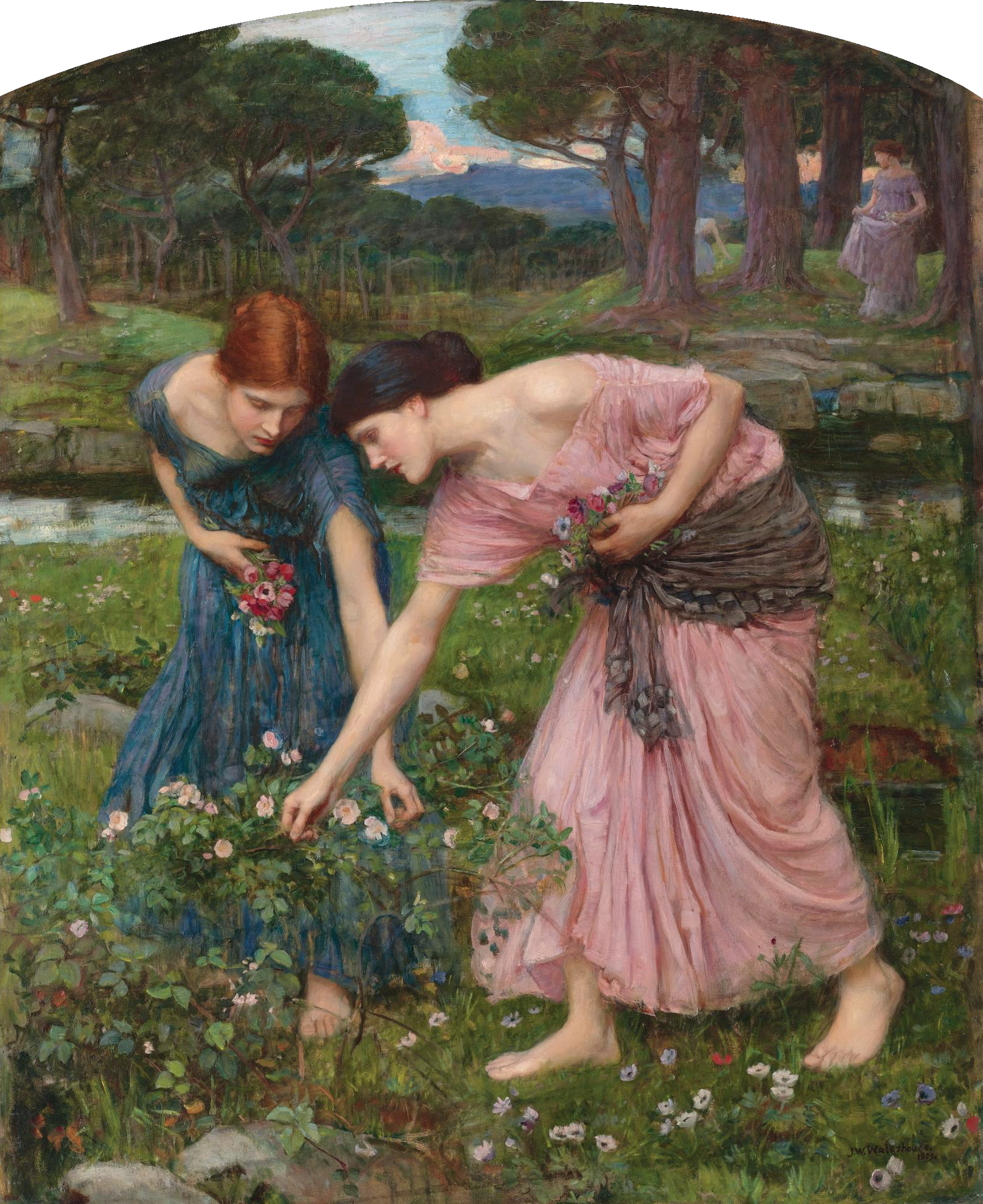
Gather Ye Rosebuds While Ye May
1909

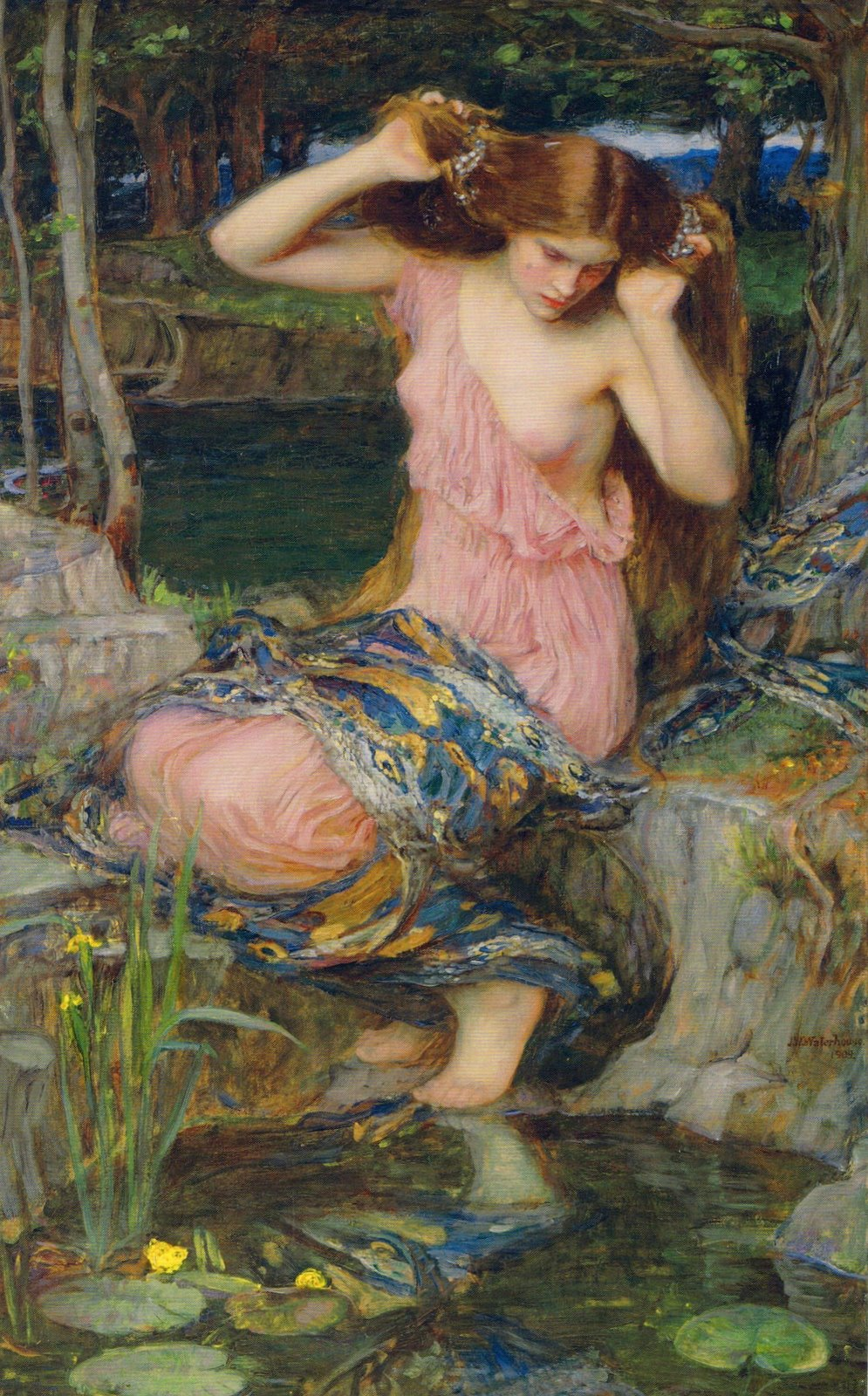
Lamia
(version 2)
1909

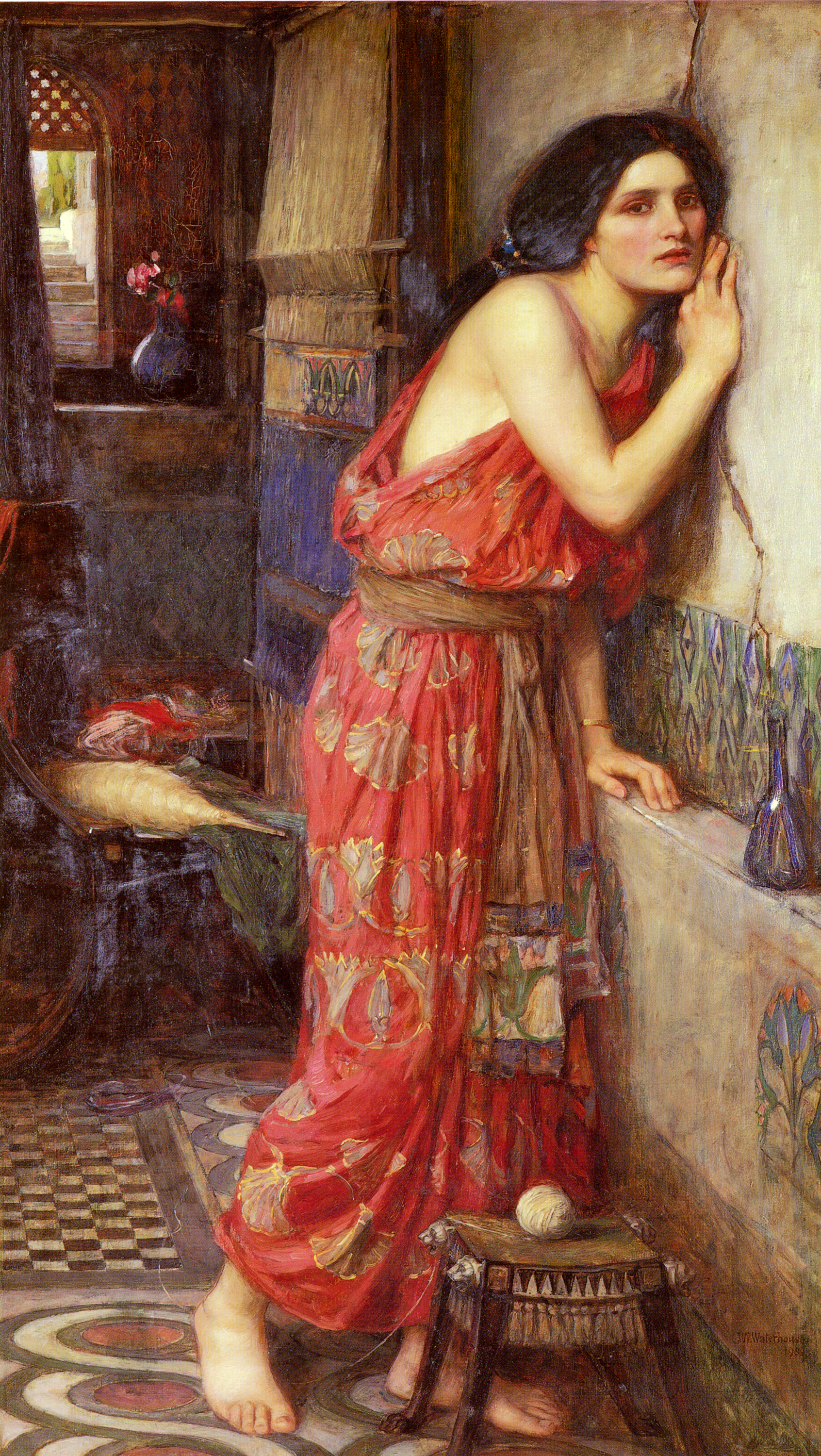
Thisbe
1909

=== 1910s ===
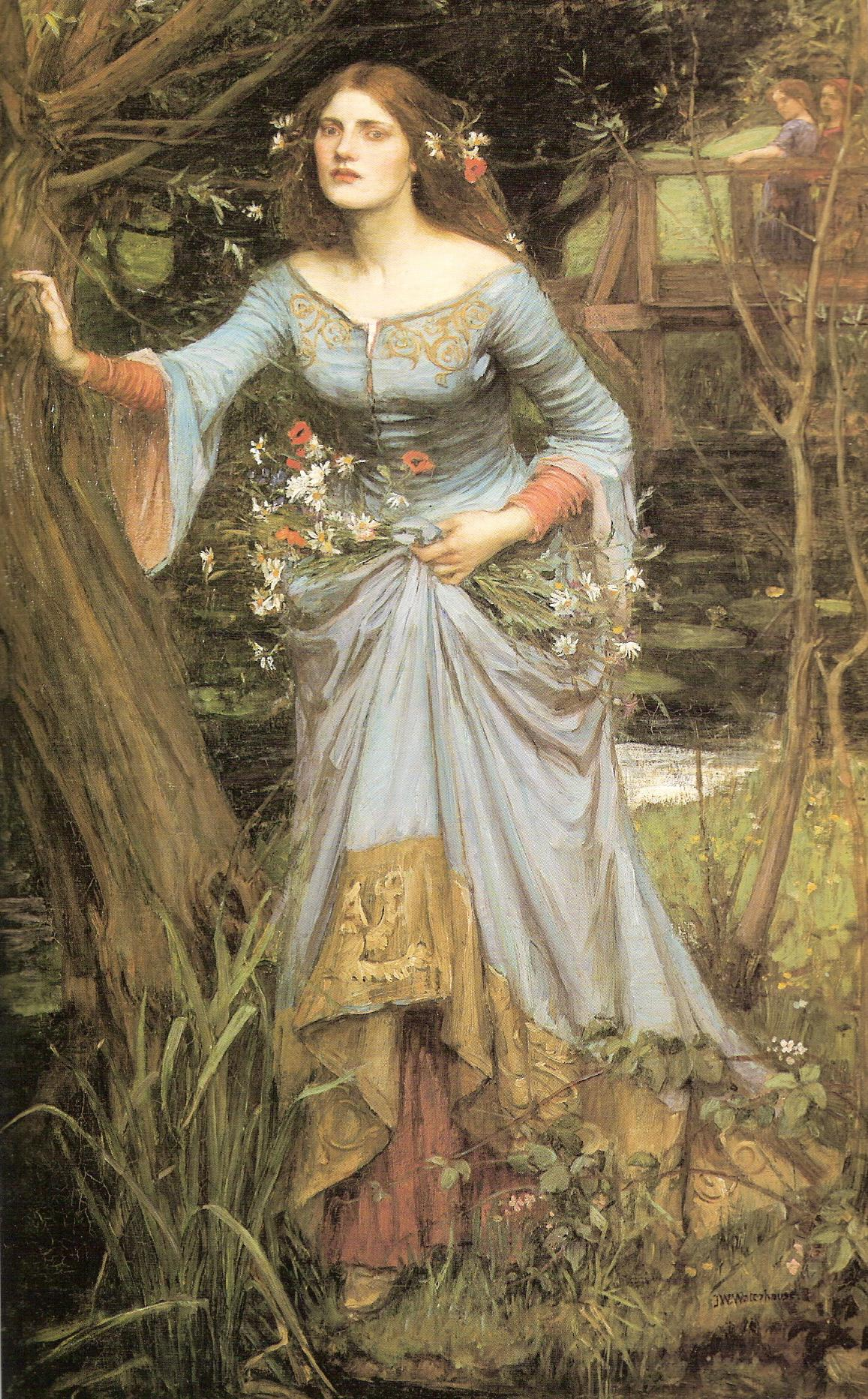
Ophelia
1910

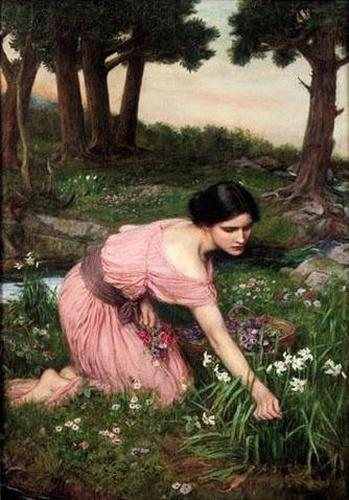
Spring Spreads One Green Lap of Flowers
1910

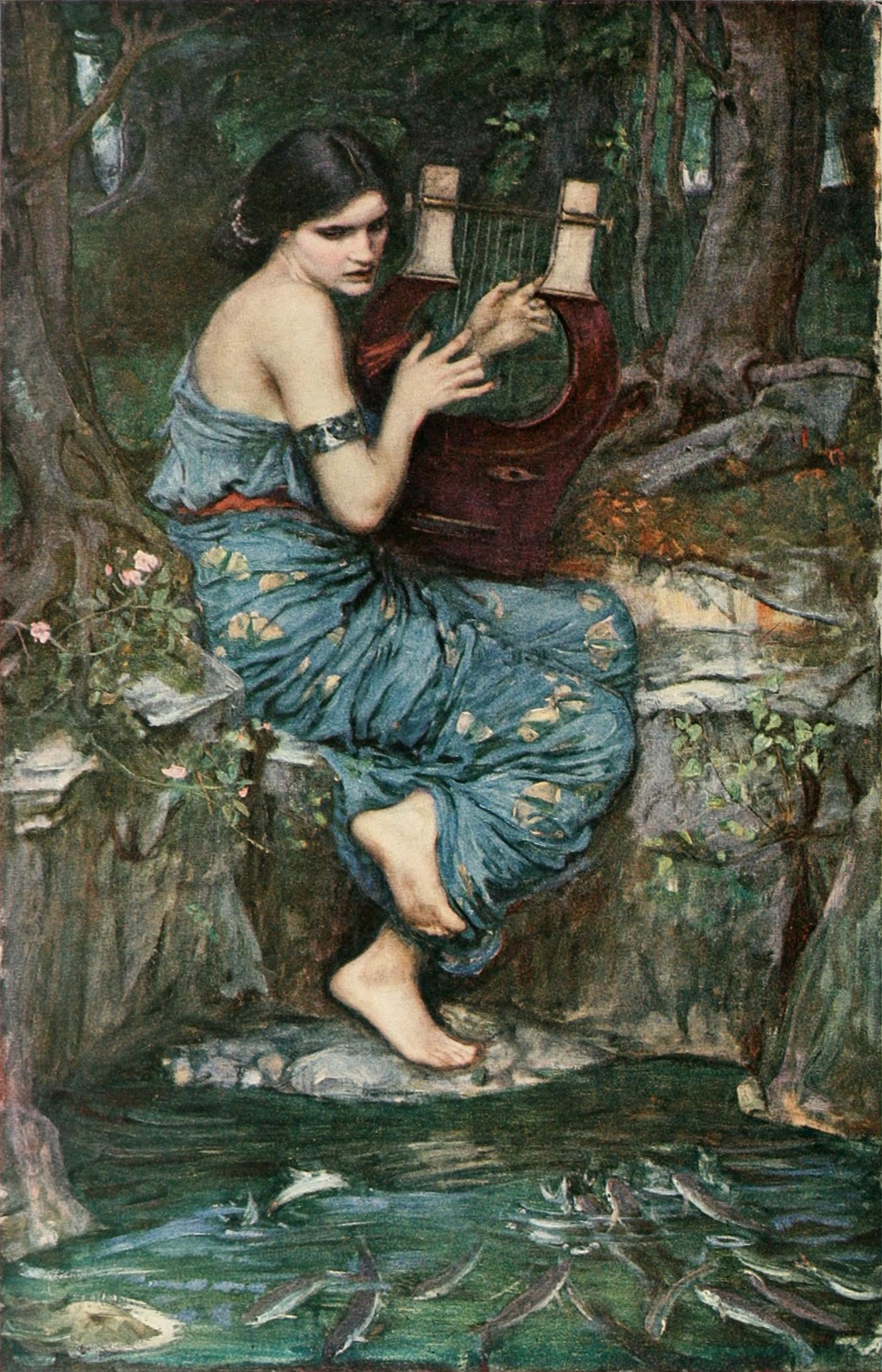
The Charmer
1911

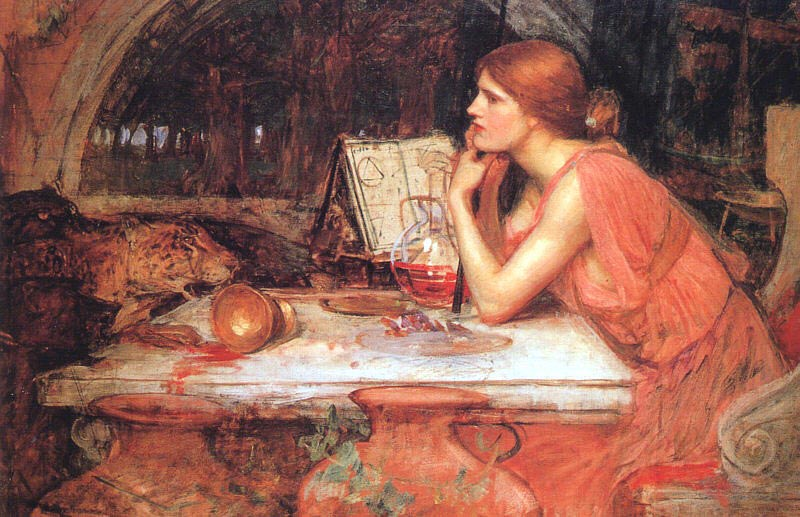
The Sorceress
c. 1911-1915

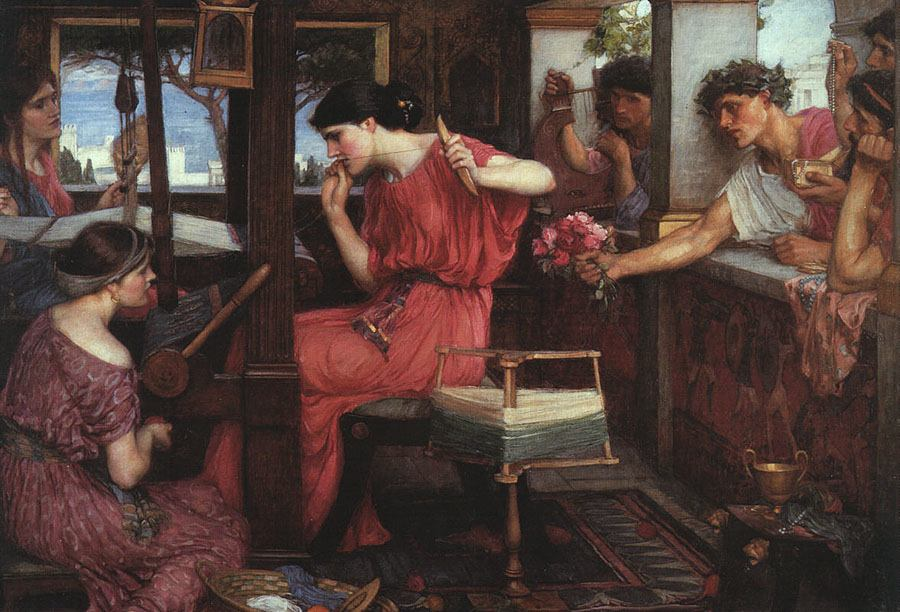
Penelope and the Suitors
1912

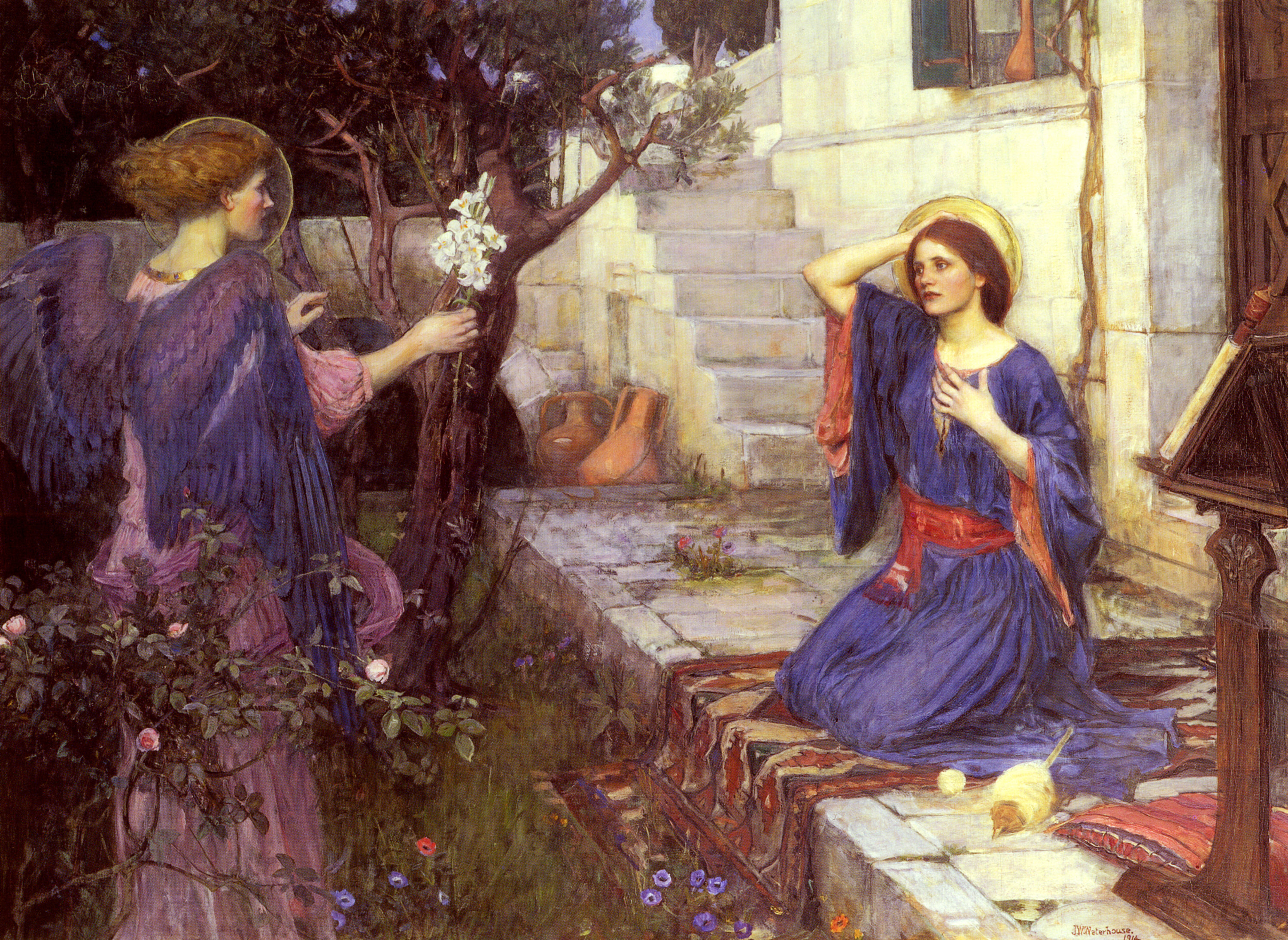
The Annunciation
1914

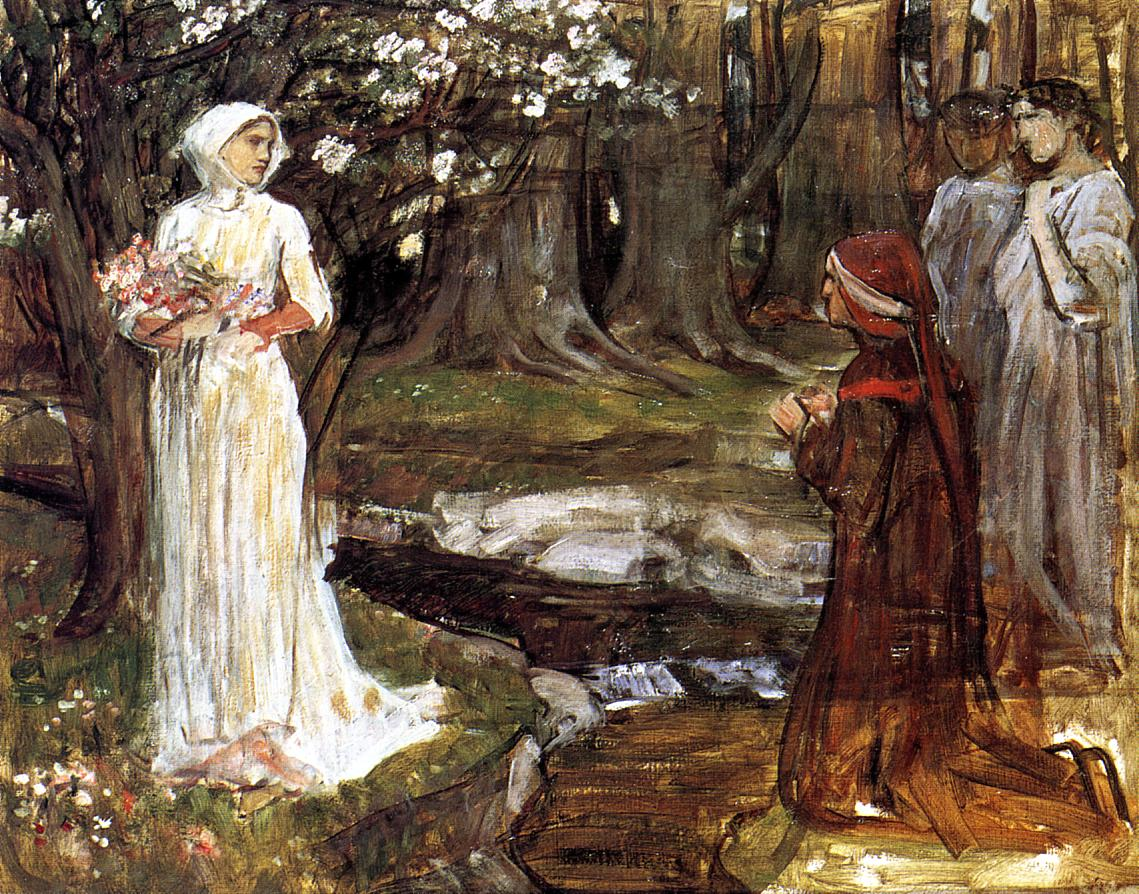
Dante and Matilda (study) (formerly called "Dante and Beatrice")
c. 1914–1917

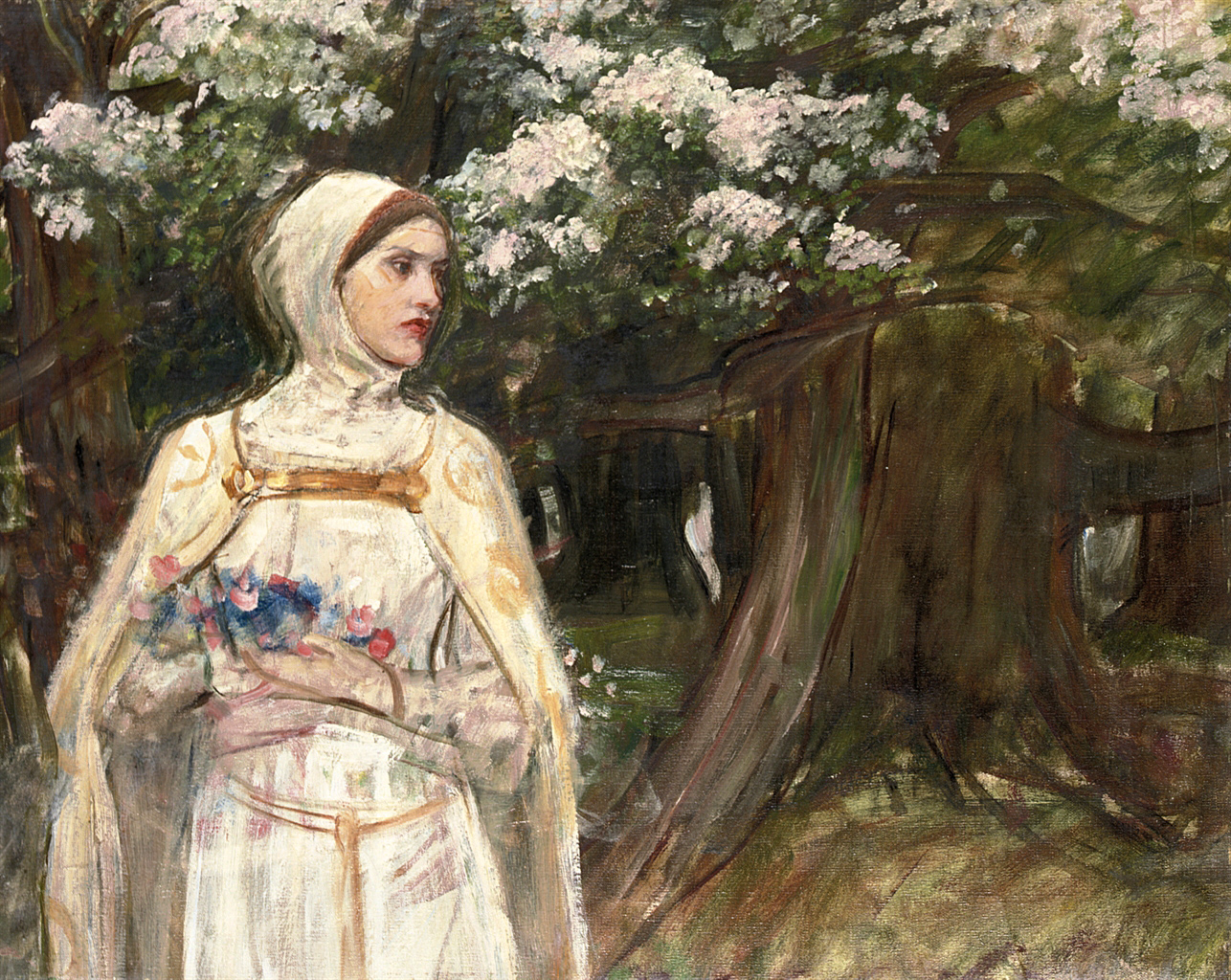
Matilda (study) (formerly called "Beatrice")
c. 1915

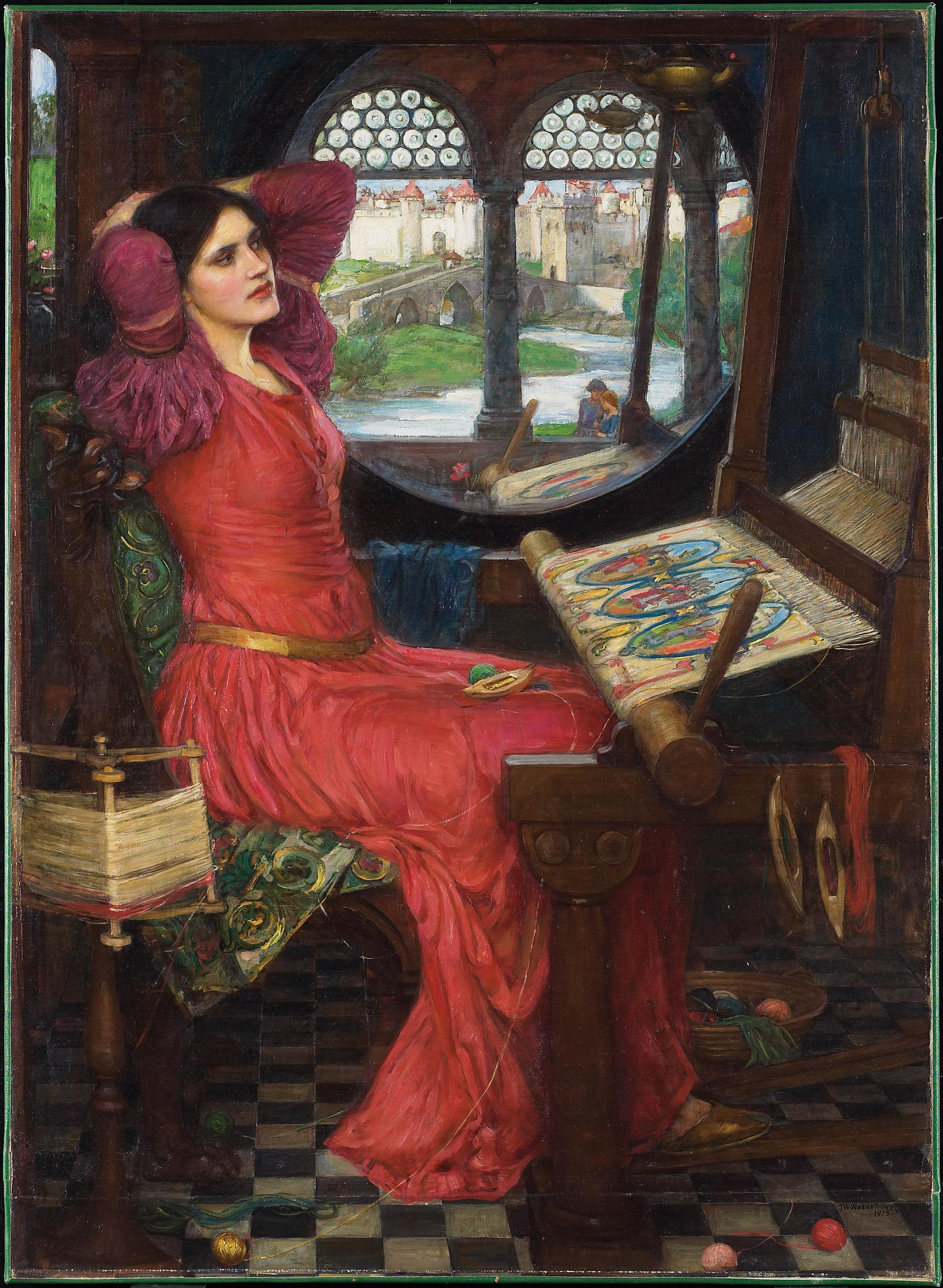
I am Half-Sick of Shadows, said the Lady of Shalott
1916

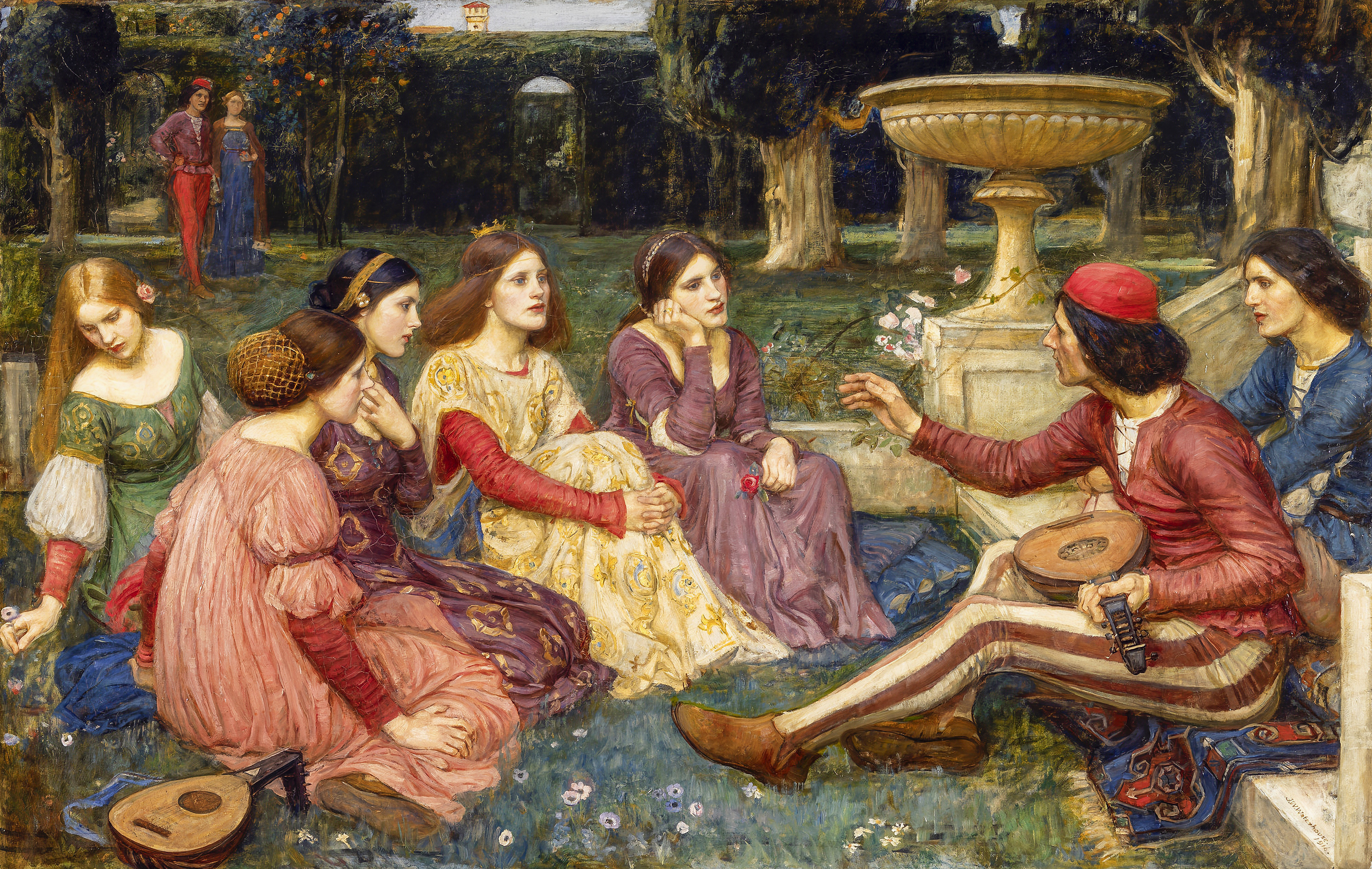
A Tale from the Decameron
1916

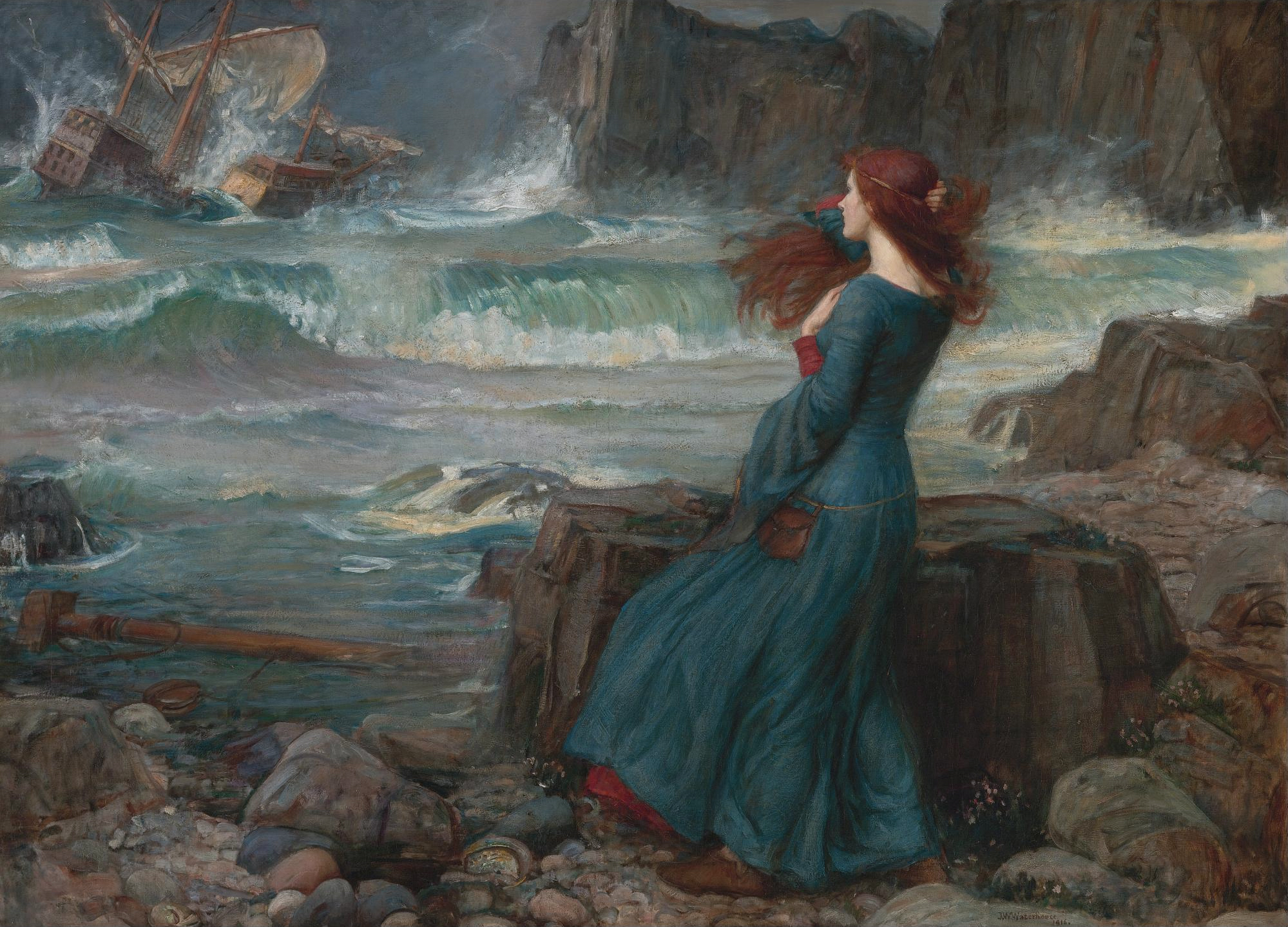
Miranda (The Tempest)
1916

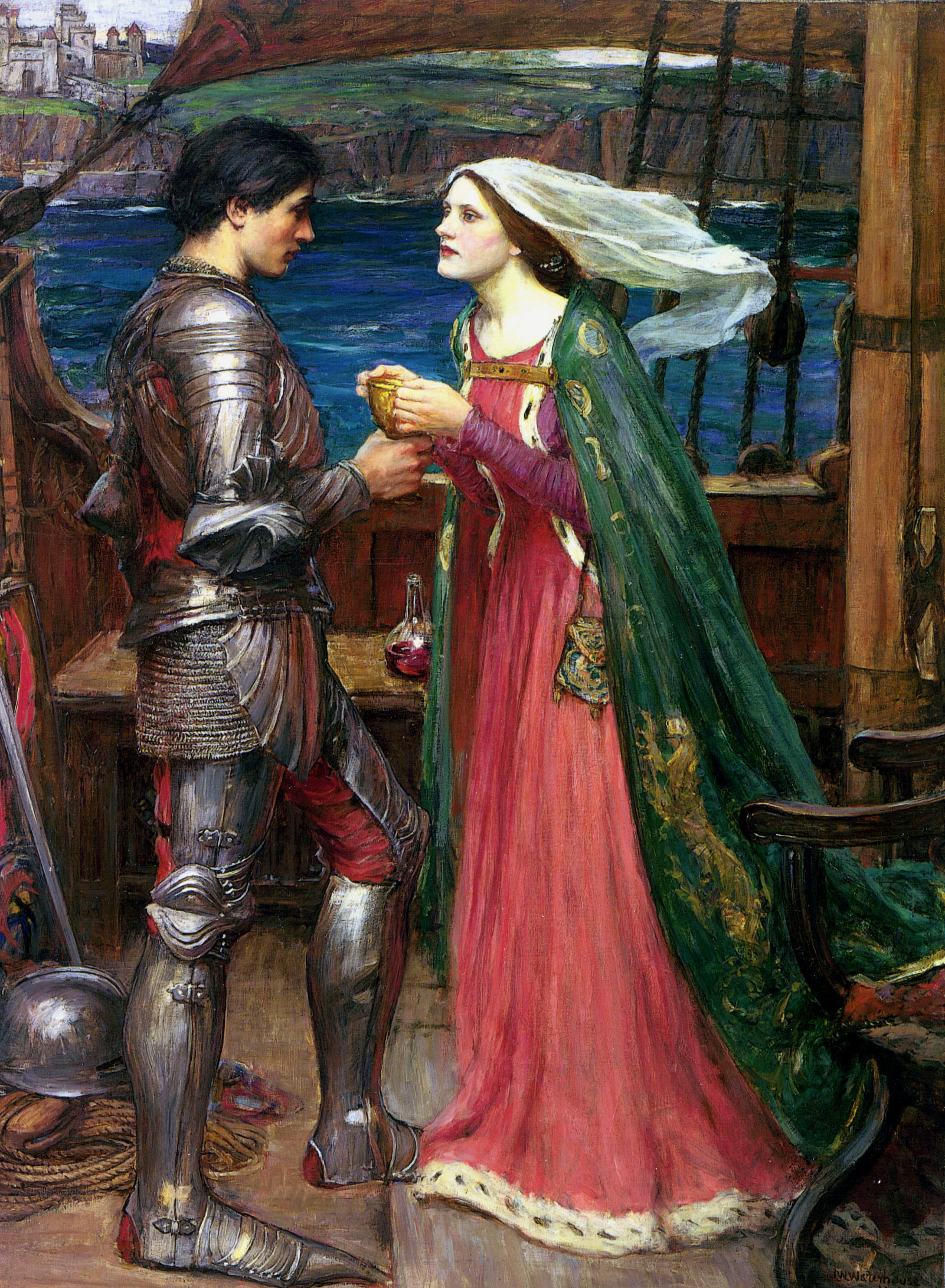
Tristan and Isolde
1916
