= List of paintings by John William Waterhouse =

This is a list of the paintings by the British Pre-Raphaelite artist John William Waterhouse.

== 1870s ==
Image	Name	Year	Current Location	Ref
	The Slave	1872	private collection	
	Undine	1872	location unknown	
	Gone, But Not Forgotten	1873	private collection	
	The Unwelcome Companion: A Street Scene in Cairo	1873	Towneley Hall Art Gallery & Museum, Burnley	
	In the Peristyle	1874	Rochdale Art Gallery, Rochdale	
	La Fileuse	1874	private collection	
	Sleep and His Half-Brother Death	1874	private collection	
	Miranda	1875	private collection (assumed)	
	Two Little Italian Girls by a Village	c. 1875	private collection	
	Portrait of a Young Woman	c. 1875–1878	private collection	
	After the Dance	1876	private collection	
	A Sick Child Brought into the Temple of Aesculapius	1877	private collection	
	The Remorse of the Emperor Nero after the Murder of his Mother	1878	private collection	
	Dolce Far Niente or The White Feather Fan	1879	private collection (assumed)	
	Offerings	1879	private collection	

== 1880s ==
Image	Name	Year	Current Location	Ref
	A Flower Stall	1880	Laing Art Gallery, Newcastle upon Tyne	
	Dolce Far Niente	1880	Kirkcaldy Museum and Art Gallery, Kirkcaldy, Scotland	
	The Household Gods	c. 1880	Private collection	
	Diogenes	1882	Art Gallery of New South Wales, Sydney	
	Summer	c. 1882	private collection (assumed)	
	The Favourites of the Emperor Honorius	1883	Art Gallery of South Australia, Adelaide	
	Consulting the Oracle	1884	Tate, London	
	A Byway: Ancient Rome or Winding the Distaff	1884	current location unknown	
	Good Neighbours	1885	Also known as Gossip or The Gossips or Washing Day. Unknown location	
	Saint Eulalia	1885	Tate, London	
	Esther Kenworthy Waterhouse	c. 1885	Sheffield City Art Galleries, Sheffield	
	Resting	c. 1885	private collection	
	A Flower Market, Old Rome	1886	private collection	
	The Magic Circle	1886	Tate, London	
	The Magic Circle	1886	private collection	
	The Magic Circle study	c. 1886	private collection	
	Mariamne Leaving the Judgement Seat of Herod	1887	Forbes Magazine Collection, New York	
	Cleopatra	1888	private collection	
	The Lady of Shalott	1888	Tate, London	
	Ophelia	1889	collection of Andrew Lloyd Webber	

== 1890s ==
Image	Name	Year	Current Location	Ref
	A Roman Offering	c. 1890	unknown location	
	The Orange Gatherers	c. 1890	private collection	
	Flora	c. 1890	private collection	
	At Capri or Alfresco Toilet at Capri or The Toilet	1890	Location unknown	
	Arranging Flowers	c. 1890	location unknown	
	Circe Offering the Cup to Ulysses	1891	Gallery Oldham, UK	
	Flora	1891	location unknown	
	Ulysses and the Sirens	1891	National Gallery of Victoria, Melbourne	
	Circe Invidiosa	1892	Art Gallery of South Australia, Adelaide	
	The Merman	c. 1892	Private collection	
	Danaë	1892	stolen - location unknown	
	A Hamadryad	1893	Plymouth City Museum and Art Gallery, UK	
	Gathering Summer Flowers in a Devonshire Garden	c. 1893–1910	private collection	
	A Naiad	1893	private collection	
	La Belle Dame Sans Merci	1893	Hessisches Landesmuseum Darmstadt, Germany	
	Ophelia	1894	private collection	
	The Lady of Shalott Looking at Lancelot	1894	Leeds Art Gallery, UK	
	Field Flowers	1894	location unknown	
	Mrs. Charles Newton-Robinson	1894	location unknown	
	Phyllis, younger daughter of E A Waterlow, Esq	1895	private collection	
	St Cecilia	1895	collection of Andrew Lloyd Webber	
	The Shrine	1895	private collection	
	Hylas and the Nymphs	1896	Manchester City Art Gallery, UK	
	Pandora	1896	private collection	
	Mariana in the South	c. 1897	private collection	
	Ariadne	1898	private collection	
	Flora and the Zephyrs	1898	private collection	
	Juliet	1898	private collection	
	Portrait of Miss Claire Kenworthy	c. 1890s	Private collection	

== 1900s ==
Image	Name	Year	Current Location	Ref
	The Awakening of Adonis	c. 1900	private collection	
	Spring (The Flower Picker)	c. 1900	private collection	
	The Siren	c. 1900	private collection	
	A Mermaid	1900	Royal Academy of Arts, London	
	Destiny	1900	Towneley Hall Art Gallery & Museum, Burnley, UK	
	Miss Margaret Henderson	1900	private collection	
	Nymphs Finding the Head of Orpheus	1900	private collection	
	The Lady Clare	1900	private collection	
	The Crystal Ball	1902	private collection	
	The Missal	1902	location unknown	
	Boreas	1903	private collection	
	Echo and Narcissus	1903	Walker Art Gallery, Liverpool	
	Psyche Opening the Golden Box	1903	private collection	
	Windflowers	1903	private collection	
	Danaïdes	1904	private collection	
	Psyche Opening the Door into Cupid's Garden	1904	Harris Museum and Art Gallery, Preston, UK	
	Lamia and the Soldier	1905	private collection	
	Lamia and the Soldier	1905	Auckland Art Gallery	
	The Danaïdes	1906	Aberdeen Art Gallery, Scotland	
	Lady Violet Henderson	1907	Private collection	
	Isabella and the Pot of Basil	1907	Private collection	
	Jason and Medea	1907	private collection	
	Phyllis and Demophoön	1907	location unknown	
	Apollo and Daphne	1908	private collection	
	The Bouquet	c. 1908	Falmouth Art Gallery, Cornwall	
	Gather Ye Rosebuds While Ye May	1908	private collection	
	The Soul of the Rose	1908	private collection	
	Gather Ye Rosebuds While Ye May	1909	Odon Wagner Gallery, Toronto	
	Lamia	1909	private collection	
	Mrs A. P. Henderson	1909	private collection	
	Thisbe	1909	private collection	
	Veronica	1909	private collection	
	The Necklace	c. 1909	private collection	
	Woman Picking Flowers	c. 1909–14	private collection	

== 1910s ==
Image	Name	Year	Current Location	Ref
	Portrait of a Girl	1910		
	Ophelia	1910	private collection	
	Spring Spreads One Green Lap of Flowers	1910	location unknown	
	Circe (The Sorceress)	1911	private collection	
	Circe (The Sorceress)	1911-1915	private collection	
	Listening to My Sweet Pipings	1911	private collection	
	Miss Betty Pollock	1911	private location	
	The Charmer	1911	unknown location	
	Mrs Charles Schreiber	1912	private collection	
	Narcissus	1912	private collection	
	Penelope and the Suitors	1912	City of Aberdeen Art Gallery and Museums Collection, Aberdeen	
	Sweet Summer	1912	private collection	
	The Annunciation	1914	private collection	
	The Love Philtre	1914	private collection	
	Matilda (formerly Beatrice)	1915	Private collection	
	A Tale from the Decameron	1916	Lady Lever Art Gallery, Liverpool	
	I am Half-Sick of Shadows, said the Lady of Shalott	1915	Art Gallery of Ontario, Toronto	
	Miranda - The Tempest	1916	private collection	
	The Enchanted Garden	1916	Lady Lever Art Gallery, Liverpool	
	Tristan and Isolde with the Potion	c. 1916	private collection	
	Fair Rosamund	1917	private collection	
	Camellias	c. 1910	private collection	
	The Rose Bower	c. 1910	private collection	
	Vanity	c. 1910	private collection	
	Circe	c. 1911	private collection	
	Maidens picking Flowers by a Stream	c. 1911	private collection	
	A Song of Springtime	c. 1913	private collection	
	The Mystic Wood	c. 1914–17	Queensland Art Gallery, Brisbane	
	Dante and Beatrice (or Dante and Matilda)	c. 1915	Dahesh Museum, New York	
	Gathering Almond Blossoms	c. 1916	private collection	
	Tristan and Isolde	c. 1916	private collection	

== See also ==
- List of Pre-Raphaelite paintings
