= Jason and Medea (painting) =

Painting by John William Waterhouse

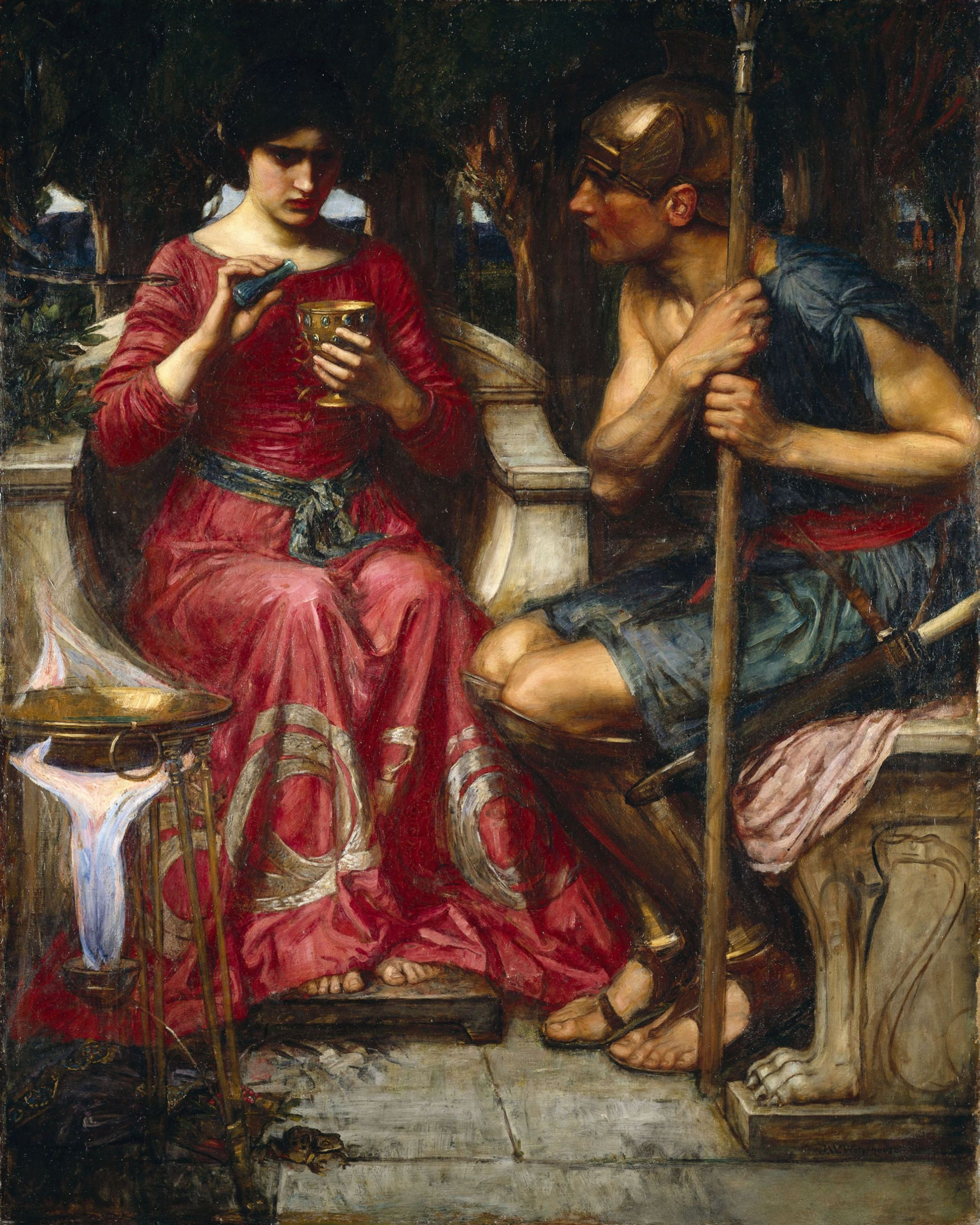
- Artist: John William Waterhouse
- Year: 1907
- Medium: Oil on canvas
- Dimensions: 134 cm × 107 cm (53 in × 42 in)
- Location: Private collection

Jason and Medea is an oil painting in the Pre-Raphaelite style created by John William Waterhouse in 1907.

The painting depicts the Colchian princess, Medea, preparing a magic potion for Jason to enable him to complete the tasks set for him by her father, Aeëtes.

Medea's determined facial expression shows a characterization consistent with that of Greek literature, particularly Euripides' tragedy Medea.

The painting is thematically and visually similar to Waterhouse's The Magic Circle.

== Analysis ==
=== Description and composition ===
The painting visualises Jason watching Medea prepare a potion for him to give to the Colchian Dragon guarding the Golden Fleece. Medea is pictured adding ingredients to a chalice. She is wearing a dress with a magic circle motif and bold icons, suggesting her role as a sorceress. In front of her, the potion's ingredients are heated above a flame. Jason appears anxious. He is wearing battle armour and holding a spear, the top of which is not visible as it disappears over the edge of the canvas.

== See also ==
- List of paintings by John William Waterhouse
