= La Fileuse =

Painting by John William Waterhouse

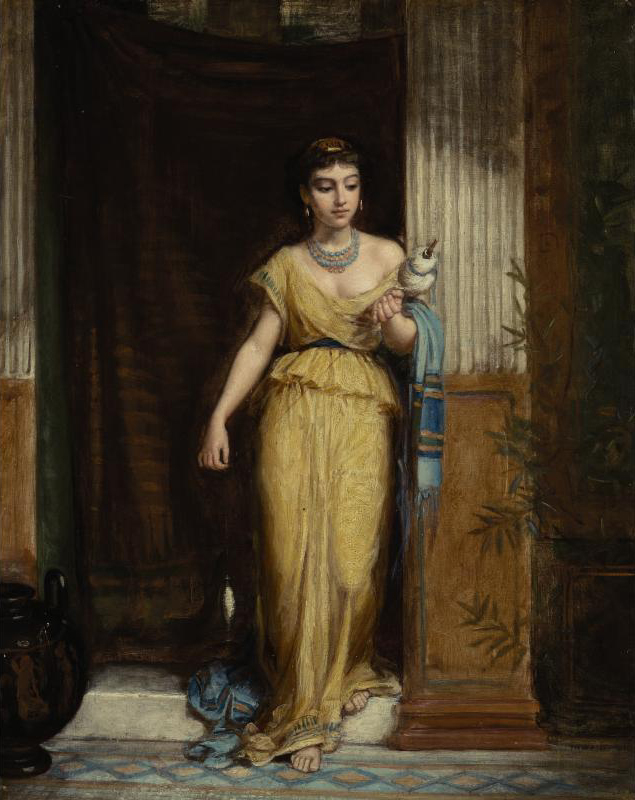
- Artist: John William Waterhouse
- Year: 1874
- Medium: Oil on canvas
- Movement: Romanticism
- Dimensions: 32 cm × 25.5 cm (13 in × 10.0 in)
- Owner: Private collection

La Fileuse is an oil-on-canvas by the English artist John William Waterhouse. He painted La Fileuse in 1874, before the period when he embraced the style and subject matter of the Pre-Raphaelite Brotherhood, so here he uses the Academic style.

Fileuse is the feminine form of the French term for someone who spins thread, fileur, hence la fileuse is a female spinner, referring to the subject of the painting. The woman holds a distaff under her left arm, a tool which is used to hold unspun fibres to keep them untangled and ease spinning. In her hands, she guides the unspun fibres to the spindle to spin the fibres into thread. The woman is Fate, spinning the thread of destiny of a single person. She can be interpreted to be the mythological figure Clotho, one of the Three Fates, who spun the thread of life.

La Fileuse is very typical of Waterhouse's work, depicting a lone female figure draped in classical clothing and her hair pinned back, with a pensive or thoughtful stare. This motif can be seen all throughout his career in paintings such as Gone, But Not Forgotten, Miranda, Circe Offering the Cup to Ulysses, The Lady of Shalott Looking at Lancelot, A Mermaid, and all his depictions of Ophelia.

== Provenance ==
La Fileuse was exhibited in London at the Royal Society of British Artists in spring of 1874.

In 1991, Italy, it was acquired by the Bonhams auction house from the collection of Claudio Bruni Sakraischik (Galleria La Medusa) (co-founder of the Giorgio and Isa de Chirico foundation). It was then sold on 29 September 2010 for £24,000 including premium, after which it remains in a private collection.

== See also ==
- List of paintings by John William Waterhouse
