= Expert wizard amendment =

Proposed amendment by New Mexico state senator Duncan Scott

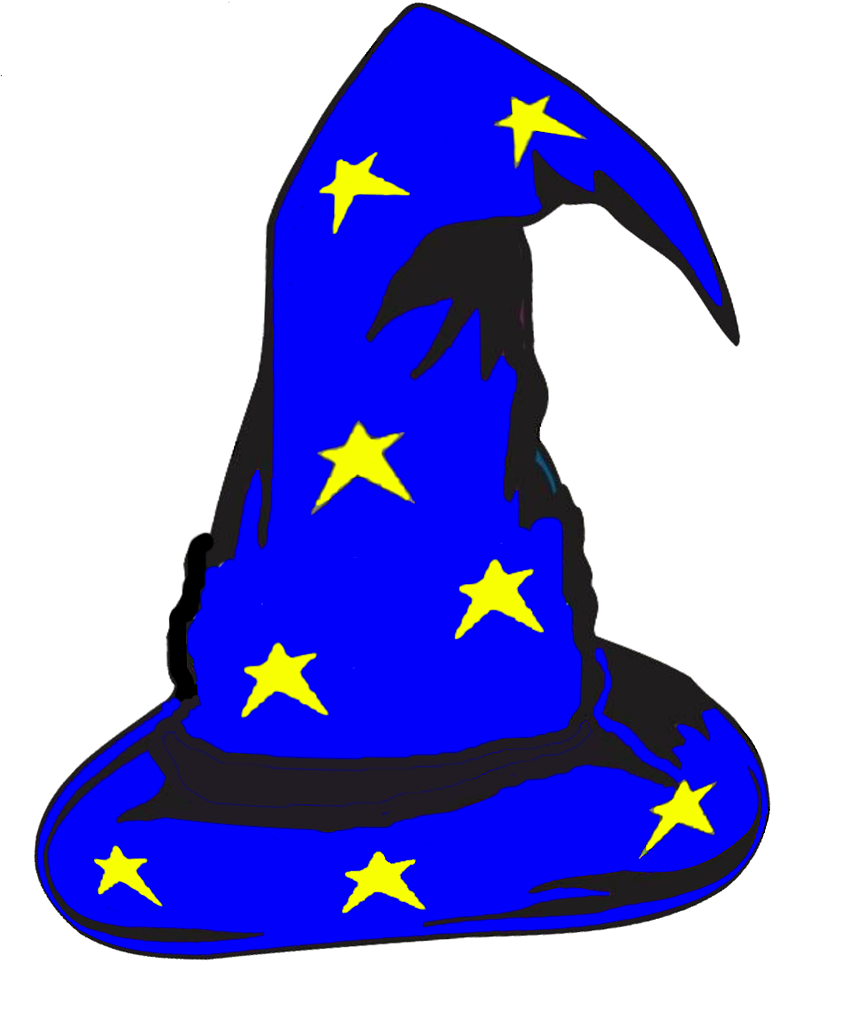
Wizard hat similar to that required by the proposed amendment, but lacking lightning bolts

The expert wizard amendment was a proposed amendment by New Mexico state senator Duncan Scott, which would require psychologists and psychiatrists to dress up as wizards when they were in court proceedings providing expert testimony regarding a defendant's competency. The amendment, proposed in 1995, passed New Mexico's Senate unanimously. Scott revealed the amendment was satirical prior to a vote in the New Mexico House of Representatives following which it was removed and thus never signed into law.

Scott said that he crafted the amendment because he felt that there were an excessive number of mental health practitioners acting as expert witnesses.

== Amendment text ==
The full text of the amendment was as follows:

When a psychologist or psychiatrist testifies during a defendant's competency hearing, the psychologist or psychiatrist shall wear a cone-shaped hat that is not less than two feet tall. The surface of the hat shall be imprinted with stars and lightning bolts. Additionally, a psychologist or psychiatrist shall be required to don a white beard that is not less than 18 inches in length and shall punctuate crucial elements of his testimony by stabbing the air with a wand. Whenever a psychologist or psychiatrist provides expert testimony regarding a defendant's competency, the bailiff shall contemporaneously dim the courtroom lights and administer two strikes to a Chinese gong.
