= After the Dance =

After the Dance may refer to:

- After the Dance (play), a 1939 play by Terence Rattigan
- "After the Dance" (song), a 1976 song by Marvin Gaye
- After the Dance (film), a 1935 American drama film
- After the Dance (Waterhouse painting), 1876
