= The Remorse of the Emperor Nero after the Murder of his Mother =

Painting by John William Waterhouse

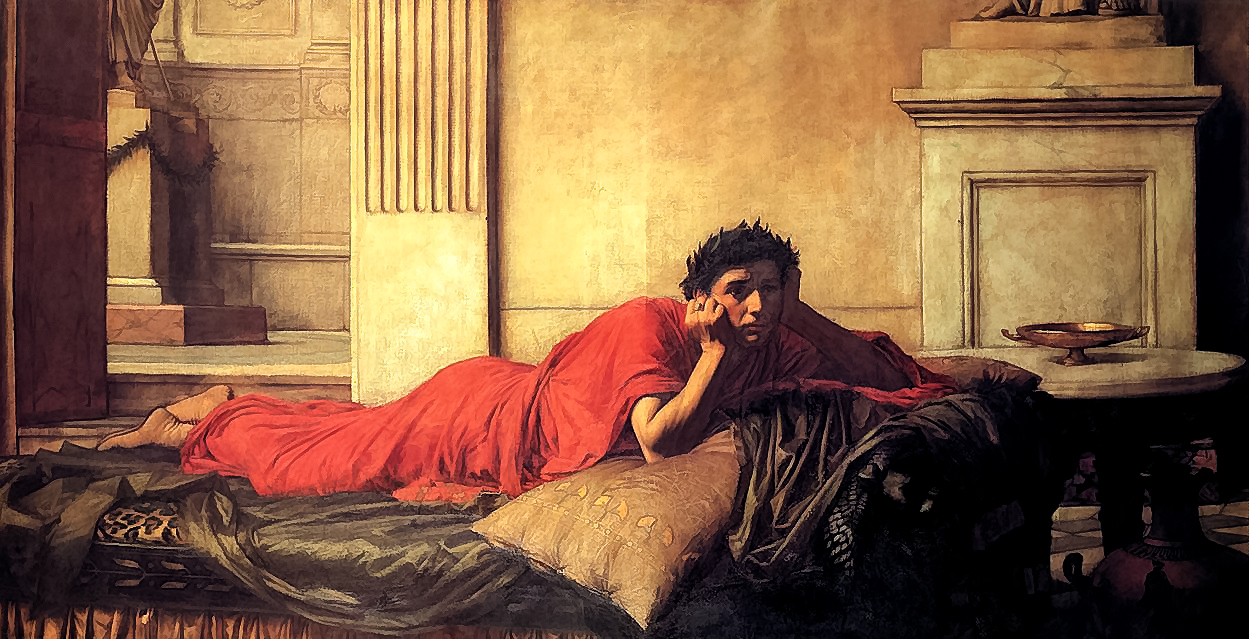
- Artist: John William Waterhouse
- Year: 1878
- Medium: Oil on canvas
- Movement: Romanticism
- Subject: Roman Emperor Nero
- Dimensions: 94 cm × 168 cm (37 in × 66 in)
- Owner: Private collection

The Remorse of the Emperor Nero after the Murder of his Mother, also known as The Remorse of Nero after the Murder of his Mother and The Remorse of Nero, by John William Waterhouse was painted in 1878 and is currently part of a private collection after an anonymous sale from Sotheby's on 19 June 1984.

== Subject ==
The painting depicts the Roman Emperor Nero contemplating his dead mother, Agrippina, whom he had murdered. In this scene, Nero lies on a bed draped in cloth and cushions, donned in a red robe symbolising both his status ("dried-blood" red was the most desirable hue of Tyrian purple, the most lightfast, expensive and sought-after dye throughout Ancient Rome) and the bloodshed he instigated. His expression is haunted and grieved, contrasting with his casual pose, exemplifying his inner conflict. The background features an Ancient Roman interior, including columns and ornate decorations. Waterhouse used deep shadows and orange lighting, emphasising the sombre, oppressive mood.

== Reception ==
In the era this painting was created, there was criticism to artists for downplaying Imperial Rome's moral degeneracy. Waterhouse's painting differs from the idealising of his contemporaries, and may even be a reaction to it. "It is an alternative image of [Nero] as melodramatic and not victorious."

The Art Journal 1878 compares Waterhouse's expressive figure with Thomas Matthews Rooke's "Death of Ahab".

The agony of the man is made painfully manifest, and we are the unwilling witnesses of his unutterable remorse.

The Magazine of Art 1878 mentions The Remorse of Nero as one of the few depictions of a classical character to be found in an English collection and explains its merits:

The composition is simple, and ... scholastic; ... the face is young, and contains no augury of the cruelty which is yet to be developed. Nothing in this work is exaggerated, or produced for the sake of effect.

Anthony Hobson writes in The Art and Life of J.W. Waterhouse R A 1849–1917, "Although a simple composition with only a single figure, it had some dramatic force. Blackburn's Academy Notes termed it a 'powerful picture'" and then quotes The Illustrated London News:

"'Considerable ambition is shown in Mr J W Waterhouse's Remorse of Nero, the grovelling figure of a person in Roman costume. Mr Waterhouse's Nero is gaunt, haggard, and remorseful enough in appearance, but he looks full forty years of age. Is the artist aware that the son of Ahenobarbus and Agrippina was very fat, and when he burned down Rome under thirty?'"

This criticism calls out an aspect of Waterhouse's paintings that was recurrent: he did not put great effort to accuracy. As seen in paintings like Miranda, Waterhouse was more concerned with mood than historical accuracy, focusing on immersing the viewer through the atmosphere rather than the aesthetics, for which he preferred to reference classical antiquity.

== Publication history ==
Instances where The Remorse of Nero has been published in a book, catalogue or similar format:

- The Art Journal January-December 1878: Vol 17, page 178
- The Magazine of Art 1878, page 138
- John William Waterhouse, R.A., 1849–1917 — catalogue of an exhibition held at Mappin Art Gallery, Sheffield (14 October–19 November 1978), and then at the Wolverhampton Art Gallery (2 December 1978–13 January 1979)
- The Art and Life of J.W. Waterhouse R A 1849–1917 pp 34, 181 (32)

== See also ==
- List of paintings by John William Waterhouse
