= The Sorceress (Waterhouse) =

Painting by John William Waterhouse

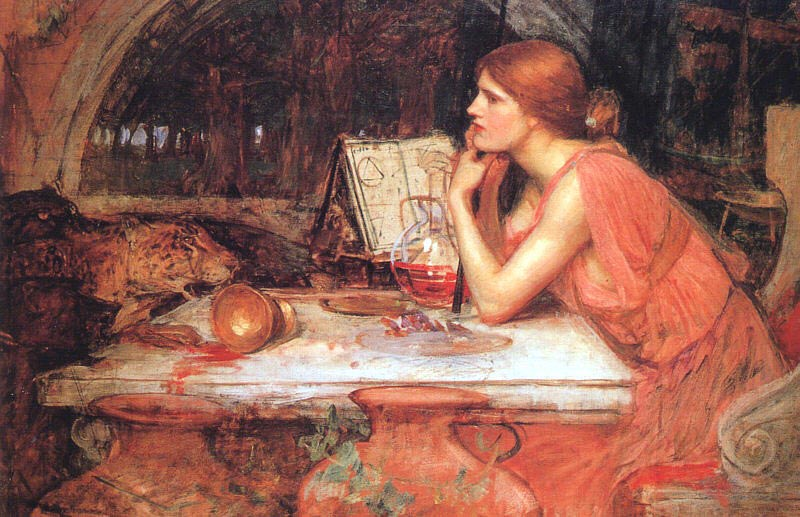
- Artist: John William Waterhouse
- Year: c. 1911–1915
- Medium: Oil on canvas
- Dimensions: 76 cm × 110.5 cm (30 in × 43.5 in)

The Sorceress is an oil-on-canvas painting by the English artist John William Waterhouse completed between 1911 and 1915. It is his third depiction, after Circe Offering the Cup to Ulysses (1891) and Circe Invidiosa (1892), of the Greek mythological character, Circe, and her name is on the back of the canvas. The inclusion of leopards and the loom offer further evidence that the painting is of Circe.

An oil study for The Sorceress (c. 1911, 61 cm × 51 cm (24 in × 20 in), in a private collection) shows a model with dark brown hair. For the final scene, Circe is depicted as a redhead.

== See also ==
- Circe in the arts
- List of paintings by John William Waterhouse
