= The Magic Circle (Waterhouse paintings) =

Two paintings by John William Waterhouse

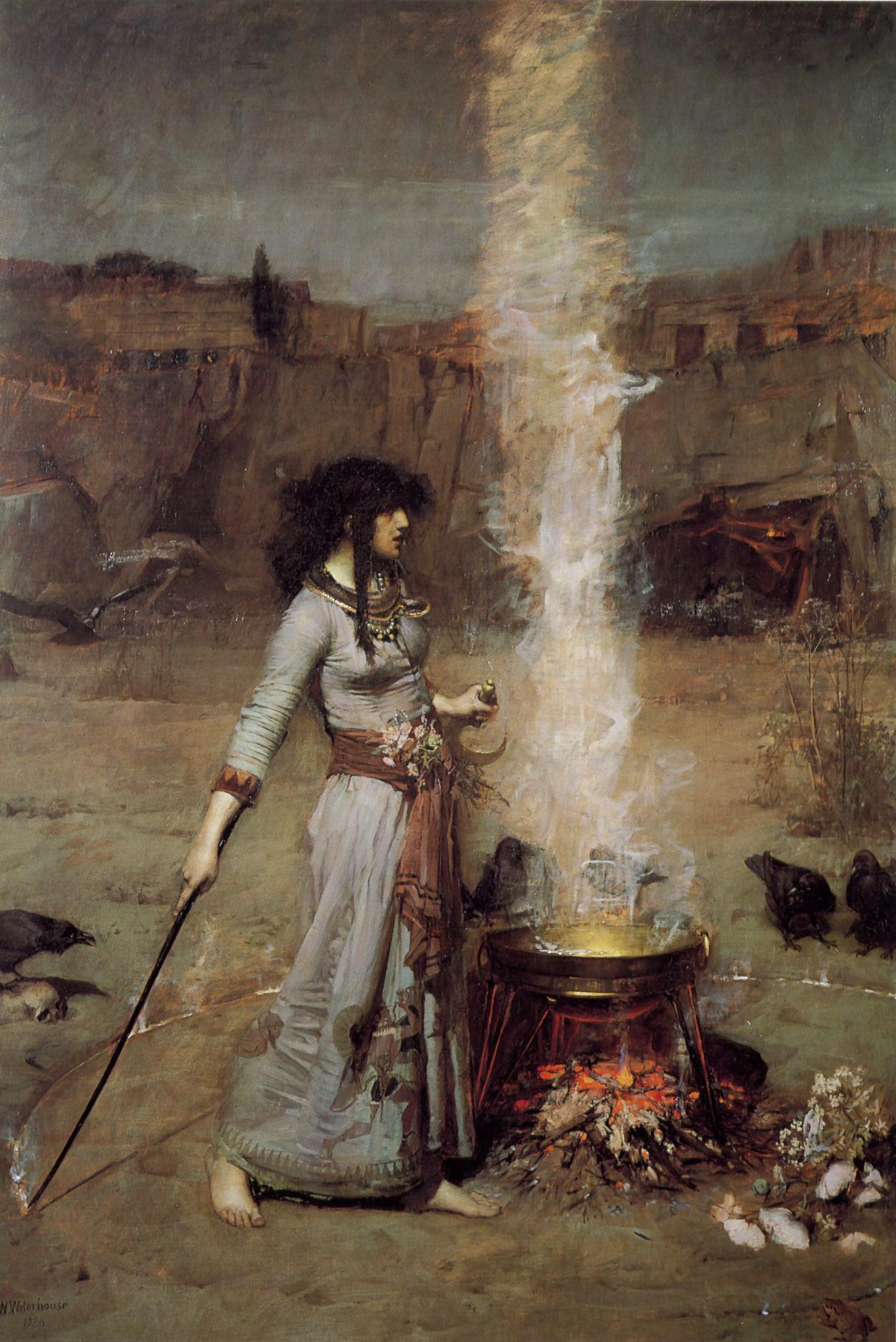
- Artist: John William Waterhouse
- Year: 1886
- Medium: Oil on canvas
- Dimensions: 183 cm × 127 cm (72 in × 50 in)
- Location: Tate Britain, London

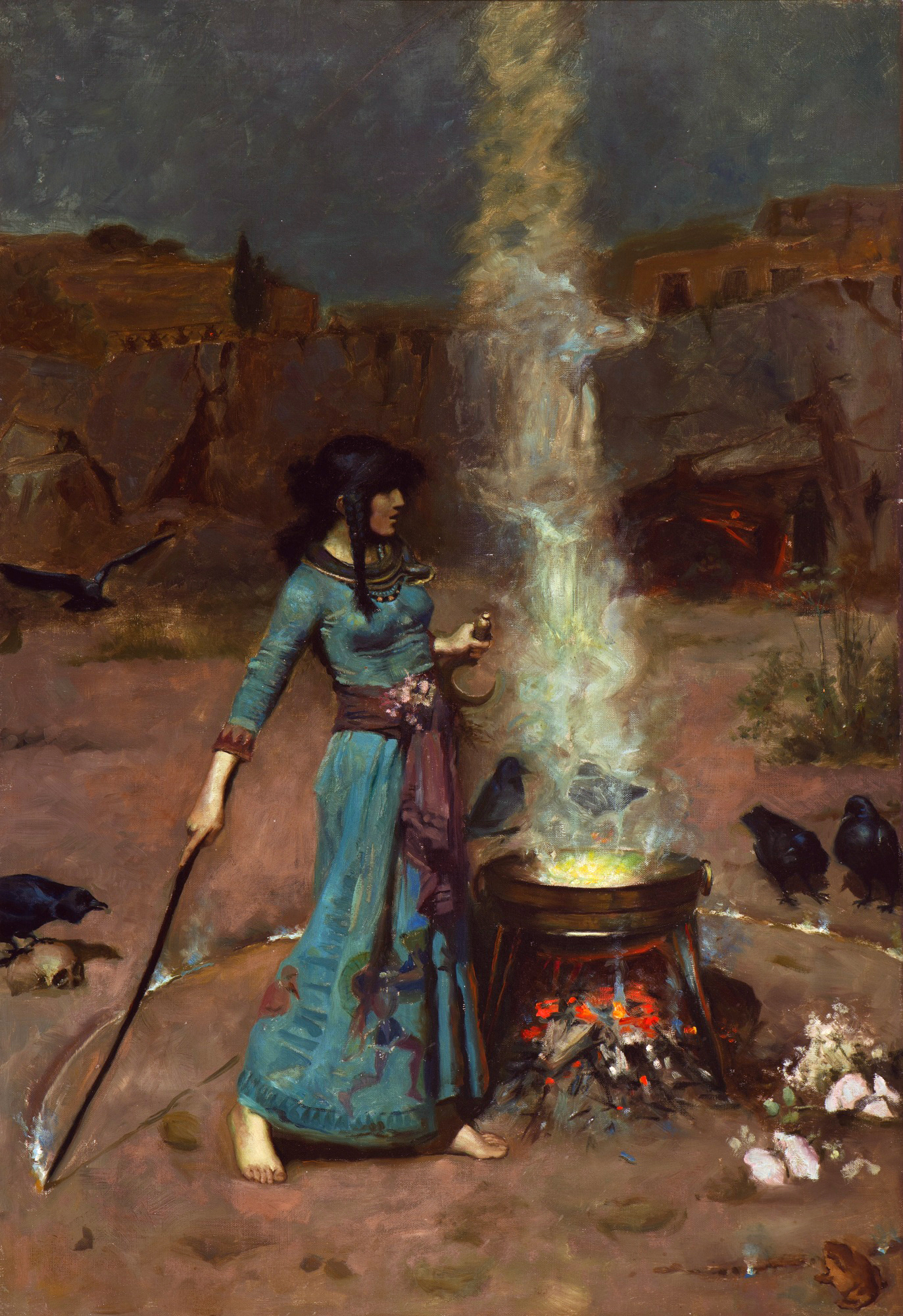
The smaller 1886 version of The Magic Circle, 88 cm x 60 cm (34.6 in x 23.6 in), in a private collection

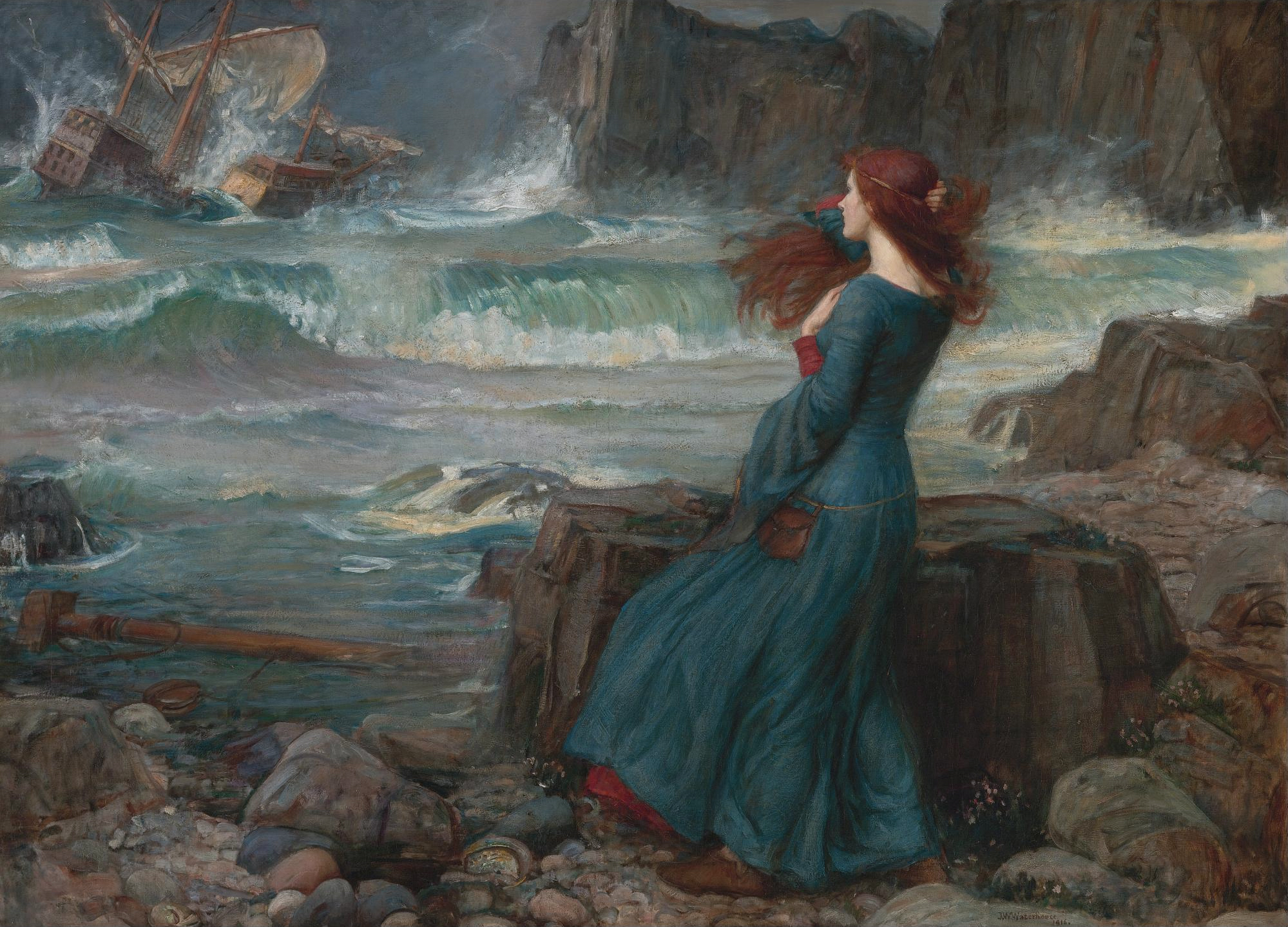
Miranda - The Tempest by J. W. Waterhouse (1916)

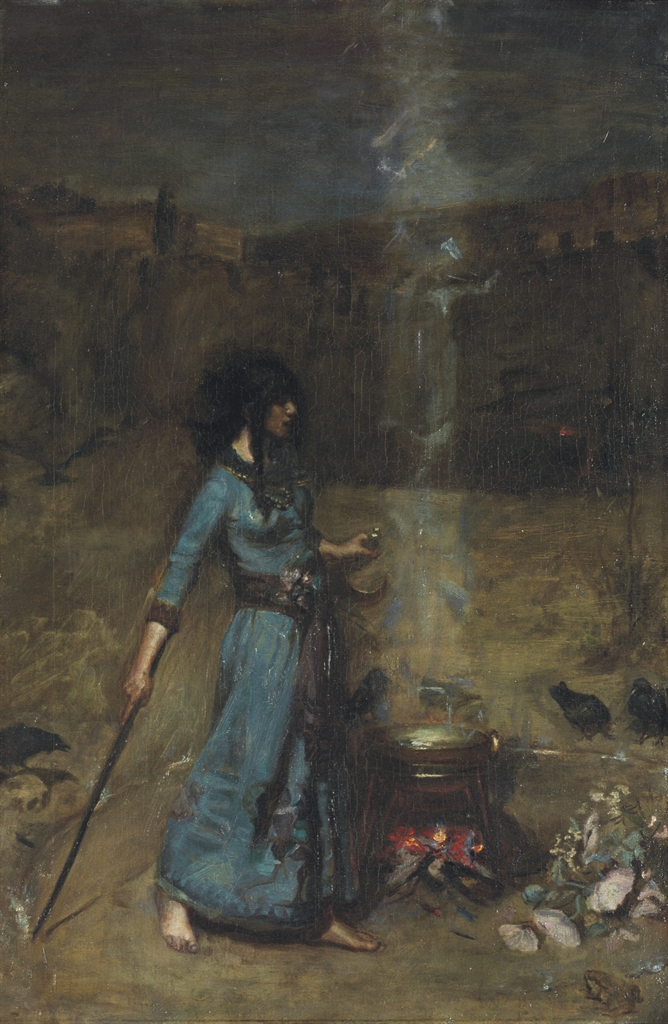
A study for the painting, c. 1886, in a private collection

The Magic Circle is an 1886 oil painting in the Pre-Raphaelite style by John William Waterhouse. Two versions of the painting were produced, and there is an oil study. All depict a witch or sorceress using a wand to draw a fiery magic circle on the Earth to create a ritual space for her ceremonial magic. As was common in the period, Waterhouse repeated his subject on a smaller scale, probably at the request of a collector.

The prime version, also the largest, is now in Tate Britain. Until February 2027 The Magic Circle is on display in Ipswich at Suffolk Archives as part of the Witches, Suffolk's Dark Legacy exhibition.

== History ==
The larger prime version of The Magic Circle was shown at the Royal Academy in 1886, the year after Waterhouse was elected an Associate member. Coming after Consulting the Oracle and St. Eulalia, this was Waterhouse's third exhibit with a supernatural theme in as many years. The painting was well received at its exhibition, and was purchased for £650 the same year by the Tate Gallery, through the Chantrey Bequest. The painting was extremely successful with the critics and public alike.

The smaller 1886 version of The Magic Circle measures 88 cm (34.6 in) high and 60 cm (23.6 in) wide. A private collector holds it. Waterhouse painted a c. 1886 study for The Magic Circle, 61.5 cm (24.2 in) high and 41.2 cm (16.2 in) wide, also held by a private collector. He initially sketched the composition in a sepia pen and ink version in 1880–1881.

The Magic Circle was on display at the National Gallery of Australia as part of the Love and Desire exhibition (December 2018 – April 2019).

== Description ==
In a style typical of his work, Waterhouse depicts a lone female figure in the middle foreground, surrounded by a landscape that is hazy, as though not quite real. In the background, at least one figure is dimly perceptible, maintaining almost exclusive focus on the foreground figure.

Waterhouse paid careful attention to the angles employed in this work, balancing the circle the figure is drawing around herself by using a triangle – her straight arm, extended by the straight stick, held out at 25 degrees to her erect body. The determined face emphasises the witch's power, her exclusion of the ravens and frog (popular symbols of magic), and her command over the smoke pillar. Instead of billowing outwards or being affected by the wind, it remains in a straight line. A live snake coils around the woman's neck.

The Magic Circle is similar in composition to Waterhouse's later 1916 painting, Miranda – The Tempest, which also portrays a woman associated with magic. Miranda wears a dress similar to the witch in The Magic Circle, and her face can only be seen in profile. Unlike Frederick Sandys' portrayals of sorceresses, such as his 1864 Morgan le Fay and 1868 Medea, Waterhouse depicted his witch with an intent, but not malevolent, facial expression.

== Themes ==
Miracles, magic, and the power of prophecy are common themes in Waterhouse's art. More specifically, the notion of woman as enchantress recurs in images such as Circe Offering the Cup to Ulysses (1891, Oldham Art Gallery) and Hylas and the Nymphs (1896, Manchester City Art Gallery). His oeuvre also includes several Middle Eastern subjects, in which he drew on the work of contemporary artists such as J. F. Lewis (1805–1876) and Lawrence Alma-Tadema (1836–1912), rather than on experience. This is one of Waterhouse's earlier works and reflects his fascination with the exotic.

The woman in this picture appears to be a witch or priestess endowed with magic powers, possibly the power of prophecy. Her dress and general appearance are highly eclectic and are derived from several sources: she has the swarthy complexion of a woman of Middle-Eastern origin; her hairstyle is like that of an early Anglo-Saxon; her dress is decorated with Persian or Greek warrior. She holds a crescent-shaped sickle in her left hand, linking her with the moon and Hecate. With the wand in her right hand, she draws a protective magic circle around her. Outside the circle, the landscape is bare and barren; a group of rooks or ravens and a frog – all symbols of evil associated with witchcraft – are excluded. But within its confines are flowers and the woman herself, objects of beauty. The picture's meaning is unclear, but its mystery and exoticism struck a chord with contemporary observers. When the picture was exhibited at the Royal Academy in 1886, the critic for the Magazine of Art wrote, "Mr Waterhouse, in The Magic Circle, is still at his best – original in conception and pictorial in his results"

— quoted in Hobson, p. 37

== Theories ==
An article in the Pre-Raphaelite Society journal, The Review, has hypothesized that Waterhouse may have painted an image of his face into The Magic Circle and that the image is only viewable at a specific required distance from the painting. The article also suggests that it may have been possible to achieve that distance by viewing the painting through reversed binoculars or opera glasses. An accompanying documentary, Inside the mystery of JW Waterhouse's The Magic Circle, presents the visual argument.

A later PRS Review essay follows this by presenting evidence that the painting is directly inspired by Theocritus's Second Idyll, more commonly known as “The Sorceress,” and in particular by CS Calverley's 1866 translation of the Idylls. An accompanying blog piece presents a detailed argument including evidence that the "face" emerging from the landscape in the painting is that of "Delphis", the Sorceress's lover, whom she is attempting to summon.

An essay by Guy Tal in Journal of Art History contends that the images in the gown have been misconstrued and actually represent the figure of Medusa, copied by the artist from an Archaic Greek vase held in the British Museum.

== In contemporary culture ==
Harry Furniss created several parodies of The Magic Circle, including one in Punch showing the actress Sarah Bernhardt tending a cauldron and another in an exhibition The Magic Circle, or There's Nothing like a Lather by Soap-and-Waterhouse.

== Popular culture ==
A reproduction of The Magic Circle is one of the paintings featured in The Great Hall at Miss Cackle's Academy for Witches in the set dressing of the 2005 children's TV series, The New Worst Witch.

The Magic Circle was part of the Harry Potter: A History of Magic exhibition at the British Library in 2017.

Another reproduction of The Magic Circle is one of the paintings with an occult theme featuring in the set dressing of the 2018-2020 TV series, The Chilling Adventures of Sabrina.

== See also ==
- List of paintings by John William Waterhouse
- Pentacle
