= The Unwelcome Companion: A Street Scene in Cairo =

Painting by John William Waterhouse

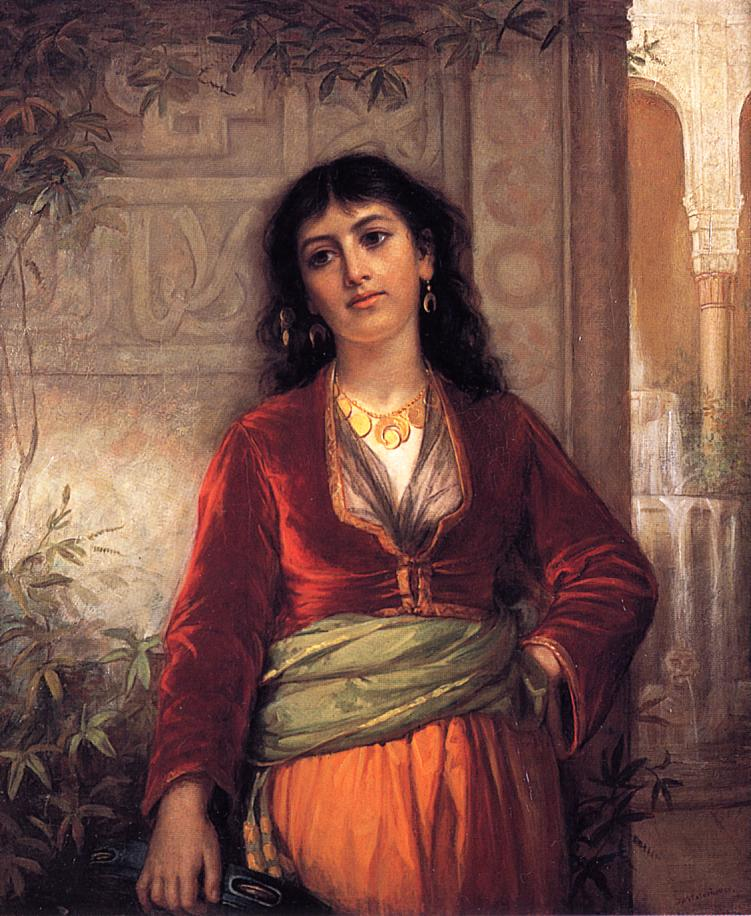
- Artist: John William Waterhouse
- Year: 1872–1873
- Medium: Oil on canvas
- Dimensions: 59 cm × 49.5 cm (23 in × 19.5 in)
- Location: Towneley Hall Art Gallery & Museum; Burnley

The Unwelcome Companion: A Street Scene in Cairo is an early painting by John William Waterhouse. Completed in 1873, it was exhibited at the gallery of the Society of British Artists.

In 1951, P. Oldman donated it to Towneley Art Gallery; it was misidentified as Spanish Tambourine Girl until a label with the correct name was discovered by Anthony Hobson. As the scenario of The Unwelcome Companion "is obscure", Hobson says that Waterhouse "Had not yet acquired that combination of an appropriate setting with the pose and gesture of the figure which within a few years was to make him an outstanding illustrator of the legends".

Waterhouse later depicted the same woman in the same dress in his work, Dancing Girl.

== See also ==
- List of paintings by John William Waterhouse
