= Ariadne (Waterhouse painting) =

1898 painting by John William Waterhouse

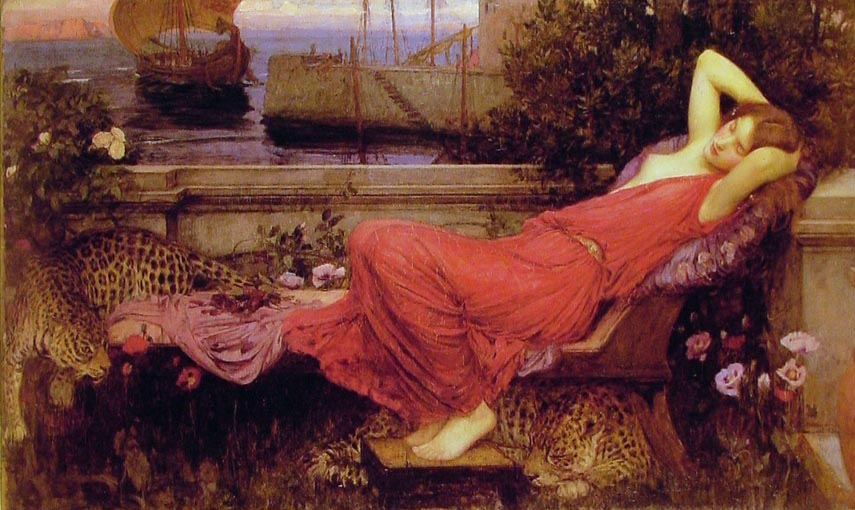
- Artist: John William Waterhouse
- Year: 1898
- Type: Oil on canvas
- Dimensions: 91 cm × 151 cm (36 in × 59 in)
- Location: Private collection

Ariadne is an 1898 oil-on-canvas painting by English artist John William Waterhouse. It portrays the mythological Ariadne asleep on the island of Naxos after she has been abandoned by Theseus. His departing ship appears in the background, while two leopards beside Ariadne anticipate the arrival of Dionysus. Waterhouse exhibited the painting at the Royal Academy of Arts in 1898. It is now held in a private collection.

== Subject and composition ==
Waterhouse drew the subject from the account of Ariadne's abandonment in Ovid's Heroides. Ariadne had helped Theseus escape from the Labyrinth after he killed the Minotaur, but Theseus subsequently left her on Naxos while she slept. Waterhouse depicted the moment before she awakens, with Theseus' ship receding in the distance. The leopards are attributes of Dionysus and indicate the continuation of the myth, in which the god finds and marries Ariadne.

The sleeping Ariadne was an established subject in ancient sculpture and later European art. Art historian Anne-Florence Gillard-Estrada places Waterhouse's painting within the 19th-century revival of antique sleeping figures and notes its relationship to earlier representations of Ariadne asleep.

== Exhibition and reception ==
Waterhouse exhibited Ariadne at the Royal Academy's 1898 summer exhibition alongside Flora and the Zephyrs. Waterhouse worked on the two paintings concurrently, and both appear in a photograph of him in his Primrose Hill studio.

Contemporary critic M. H. Spielmann used the phrase "sweet girl-fatalist" when discussing the female figures in Ariadne and Flora and the Zephyrs. Waterhouse scholar Peter Trippi later connected the description to the artist's recurring Symbolist treatment of mythological women. Kilian Kohn's study of Waterhouse's critical reception notes that some contemporary responses to Ariadne were negative, particularly regarding the perceived lack of variation among Waterhouse's female figures.

== Provenance ==
A reproduction published in The Studio in its 1898 record of contemporary art identified the painting as belonging to H. W. Henderson. The work is now recorded as being in a private collection.

== See also ==
- List of paintings by John William Waterhouse
