= Undine (Waterhouse painting) =

Painting by John William Waterhouse

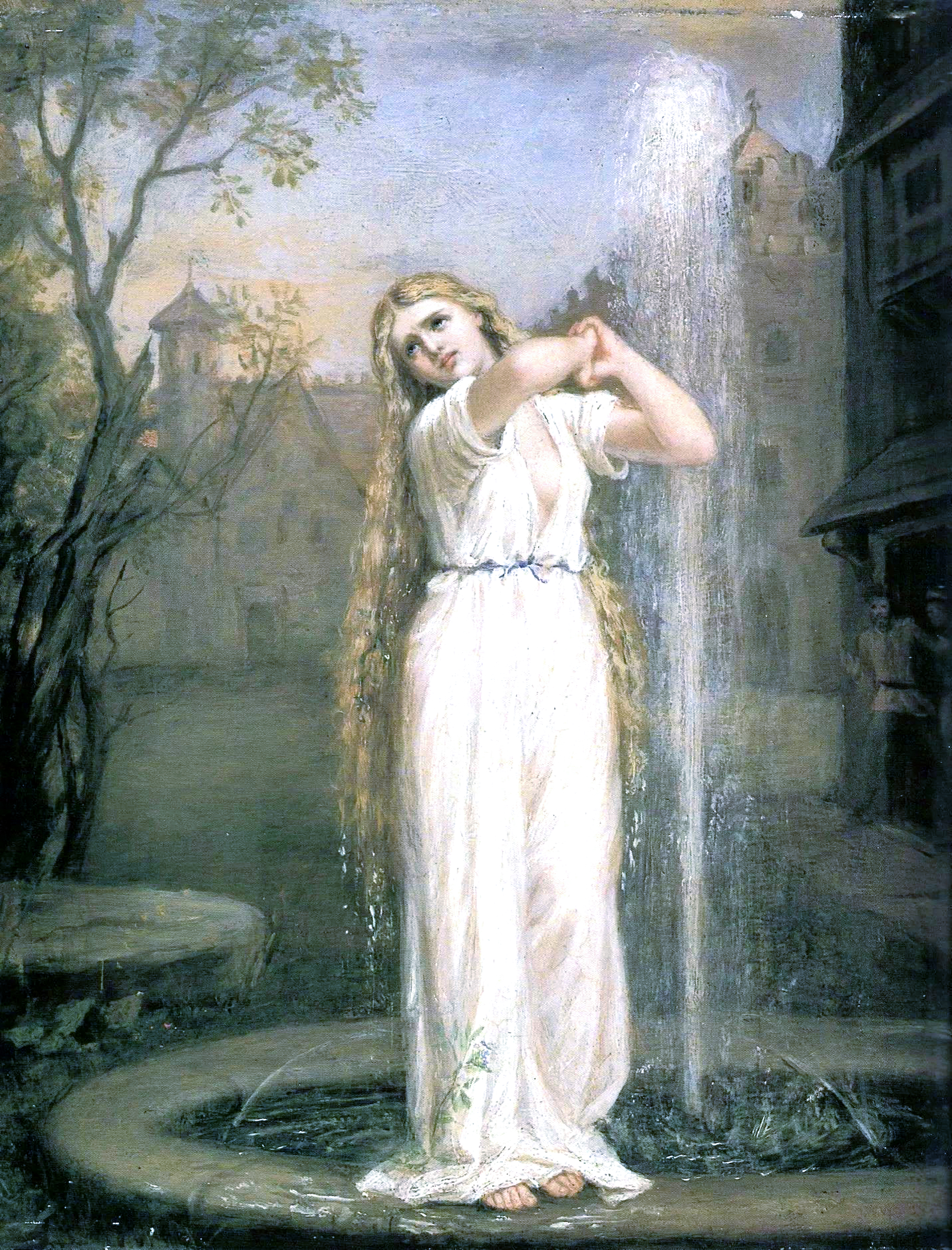
- Artist: John William Waterhouse
- Year: 1872
- Medium: Oil on canvas

Undine (1872) by John William Waterhouse was painted in the Romanticism style, and typical of the style it has a reverence for the supernatural. It was once exhibited at the Royal Society of British Artists but its location is currently unknown.

Depicted is an undine, a mythological creature from European folklore, "a water nymph who becomes human when she falls in love with a man but is doomed to die if he is unfaithful to her." She is dressed in white and has long, wavy blonde hair. She clasps her hands and stares into the distance with longing or mourning. A spout of water rises behind her from the fountain she stands on the rim of, and further behind her is the scene of a street including some buildings and a tree. A man and woman are emerging from one of the buildings, the man most of the way out of the doorway and seemingly rushing to the undine.

From the book J.W. Waterhouse by Peter Trippi:

Waterhouse clearly shared the Romantics’ fascination with supernatural characters and experiences because they pointed to the spirit of that which cannot be seen: to abstract ideas (in this picture, the spirituality of nature) dismissed by modern science and positivism. Undine is also the first of Waterhouse’s many young female figures, the blank slate on which artists have long projected various meanings.

== See also ==
- List of paintings by John William Waterhouse
