= Wand =

Rod associated with magic

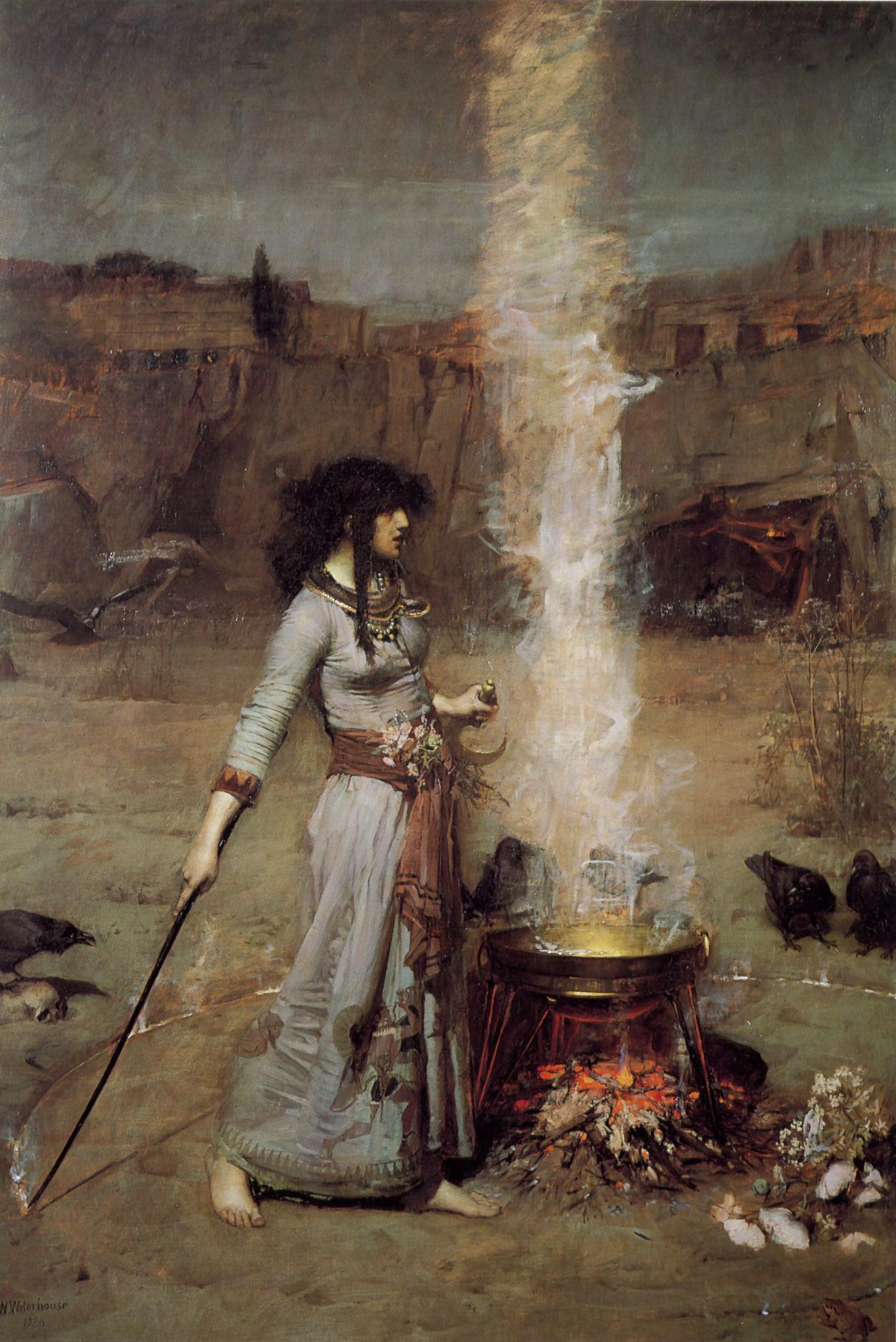
The Magic Circle, by John William Waterhouse (1886), portrays a woman using a wand to create a ritual space.

A wand is a thin, light-weight rod that is held with one hand, and is traditionally made of wood, but may also be made of other materials, such as metal, bone or stone. Long versions of wands are often styled in forms of staves or sceptres, which could have large ornamentation on the top.

In modern times, wands are usually associated with stage magic or supernatural magic, but there have been other uses, all stemming from the original meaning as a synonym of rod and virge. A stick that is used for reaching, pointing, drawing in the dirt, and directing other people, is one of the earliest and simplest of tools.

== History ==
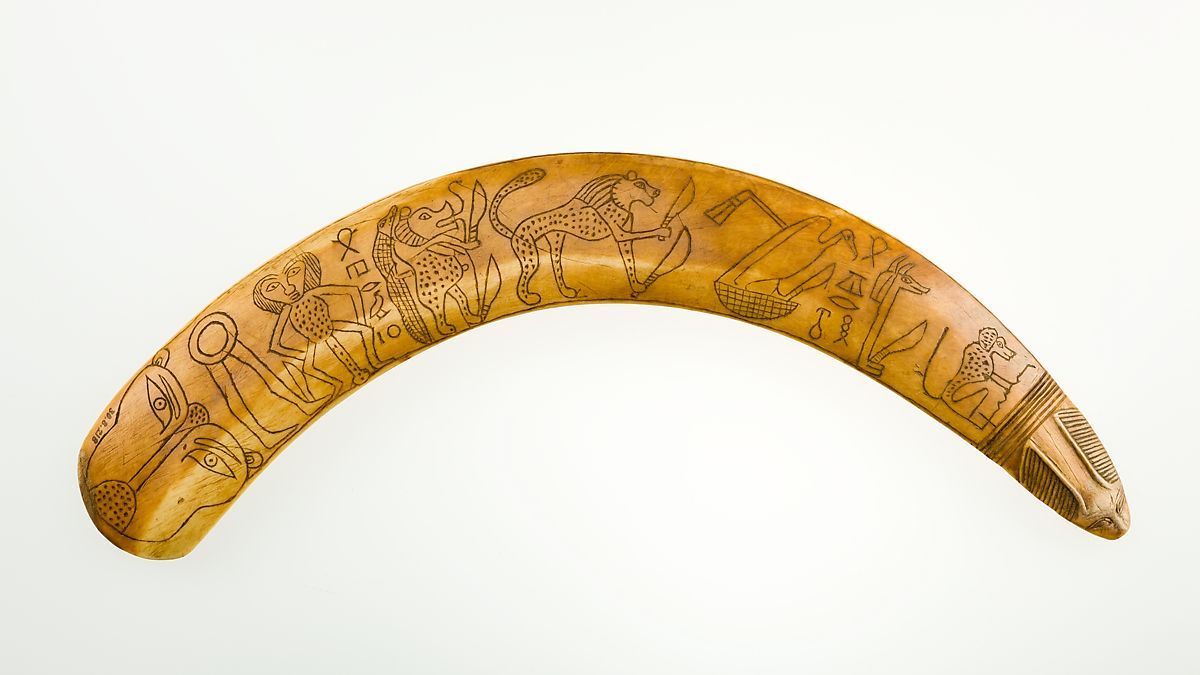
Ancient Egyptian apotropaic wand carved from a hippopotamus tusk

It is possible that wands were used by pre-historic peoples. 'Rods' (as well as rings) were found with the Red Lady of Paviland in Britain. It is mentioned in Gower – A Guide to Ancient and Historic Monuments on the Gower Peninsula that these might have been wands and are depicted as such in a reconstruction drawing of the burial of the 'Red Lady'.

During the Middle Kingdom of Egypt, apotropaic wands began to be used during birth ceremonies. These wands were made out of hippopotamus tusks which were split down the middle lengthwise, producing two wands, each with one flat side and one curved side. Due to the curved nature of a hippopotamus tusk, these wands were curved, with one pointed end (the point of the tusk) and one blunt end (where the tusk was removed from the hippopotamus). Hippopotamus tusks may have been used to invoke Taweret the hippopotamus goddess of childbirth. The earliest apotropaic wands used in Egypt were undecorated, but "from around 1850 BC, they were usually provided with decorations of apotropaic figures directly related to the sun religion, or particular aspects of it, inscribed on the convex upper side... most of whom carry knives to ward off evil forces". These apotropaic wands were also inscribed with protective text on the flat side, such as "Cut off the head of the enemy when he enters the chamber of the children whom the lady... has borne". The latest apotropaic wand found belongs to the Second Intermediate Period king Senebkay. It seems that the use of these objects in Egypt declines after this point.

The Barsom used by Zoroastrian Magi is a bundle of twigs that was used during religious ceremonies. While the Barsom is not a wand itself, it was also used for divination purposes, and may be a form of prototypical wand from which later magical wands descend.

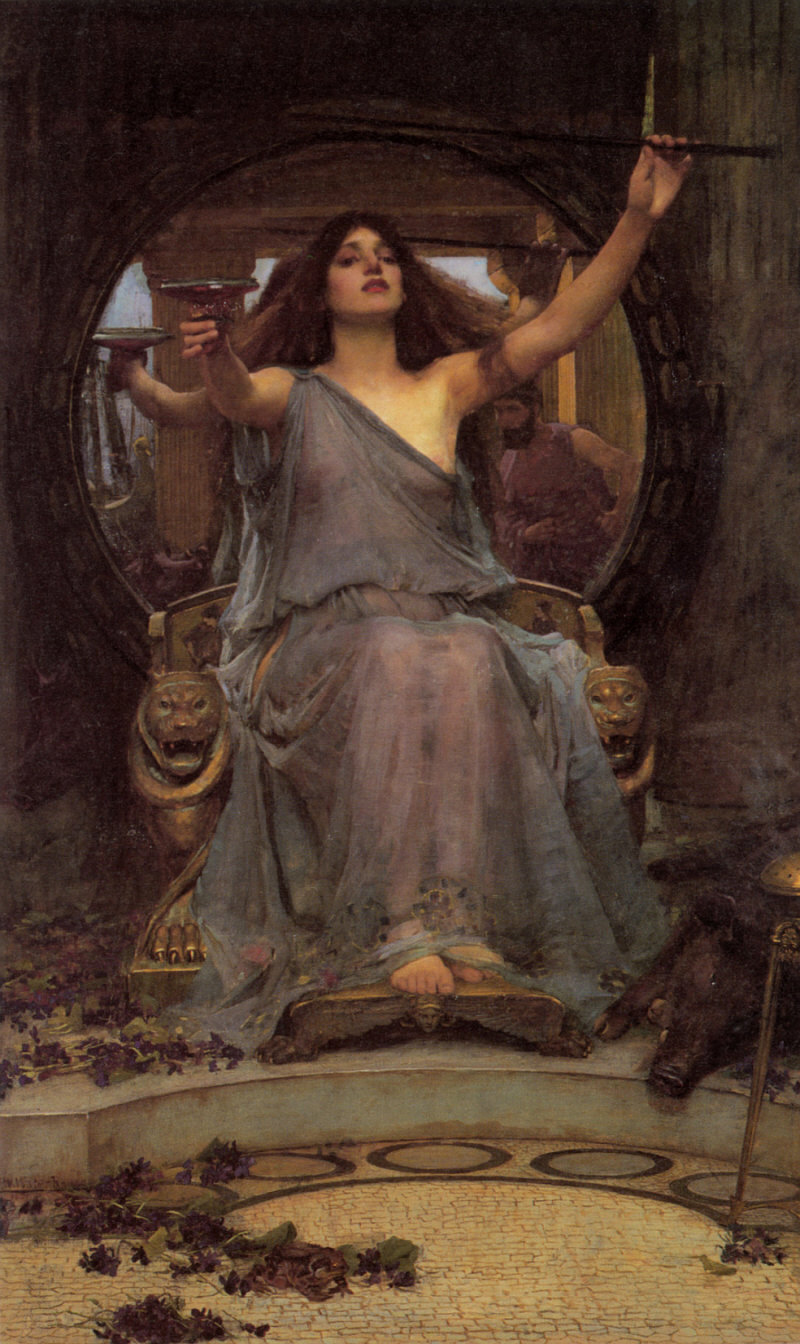
Circe with her magical wand, in Circe Offering the Cup to Ulysses, an 1891 painting by John William Waterhouse

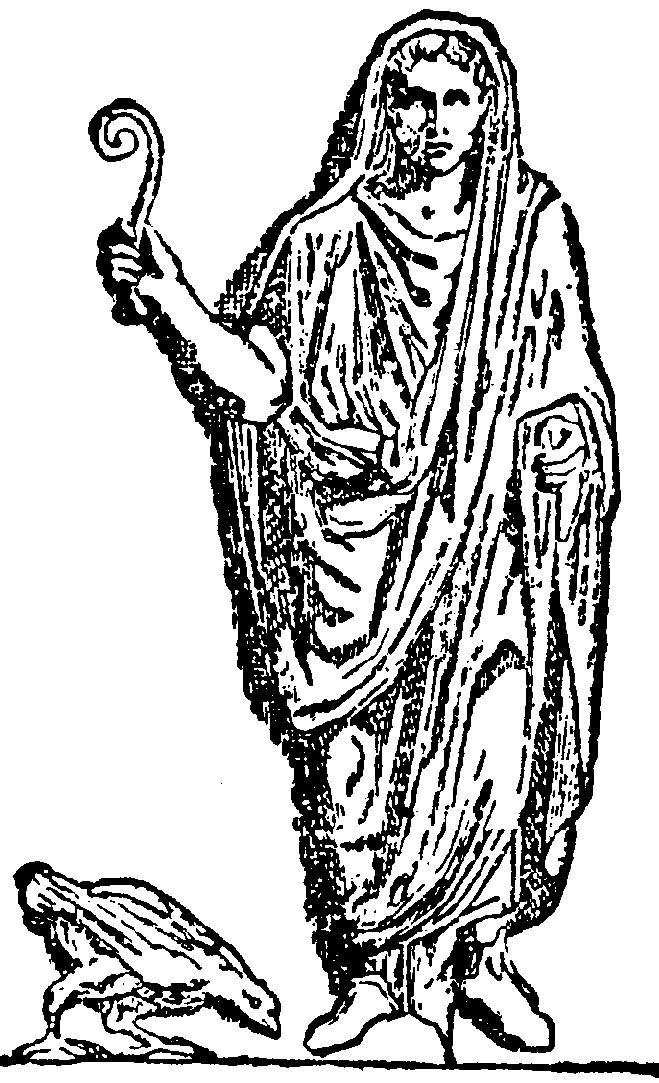
An augur holding a lituus, the curved wand often used as a symbol of augury on Roman coins

The concept of magic wands was used by the ancient Greek writer Homer, in his epic poems The Iliad and The Odyssey. In all cases, Homer used the word rhabdos (ῥάβδος), which means 'rod', and implies something that is thicker than the modern conception of wands. In those books, Homer wrote that magic wands were used by three different gods, namely Hermes, Athena, and Circe. In The Iliad, Homer wrote that Hermes generally used his magic wand Caduceus to make people sleep and wake up. In The Odyssey, Homer wrote that Athena used her magic wand to make Odysseus old, and then young again, and that Circe used her magic wand to turn Odysseus's men into pigs.

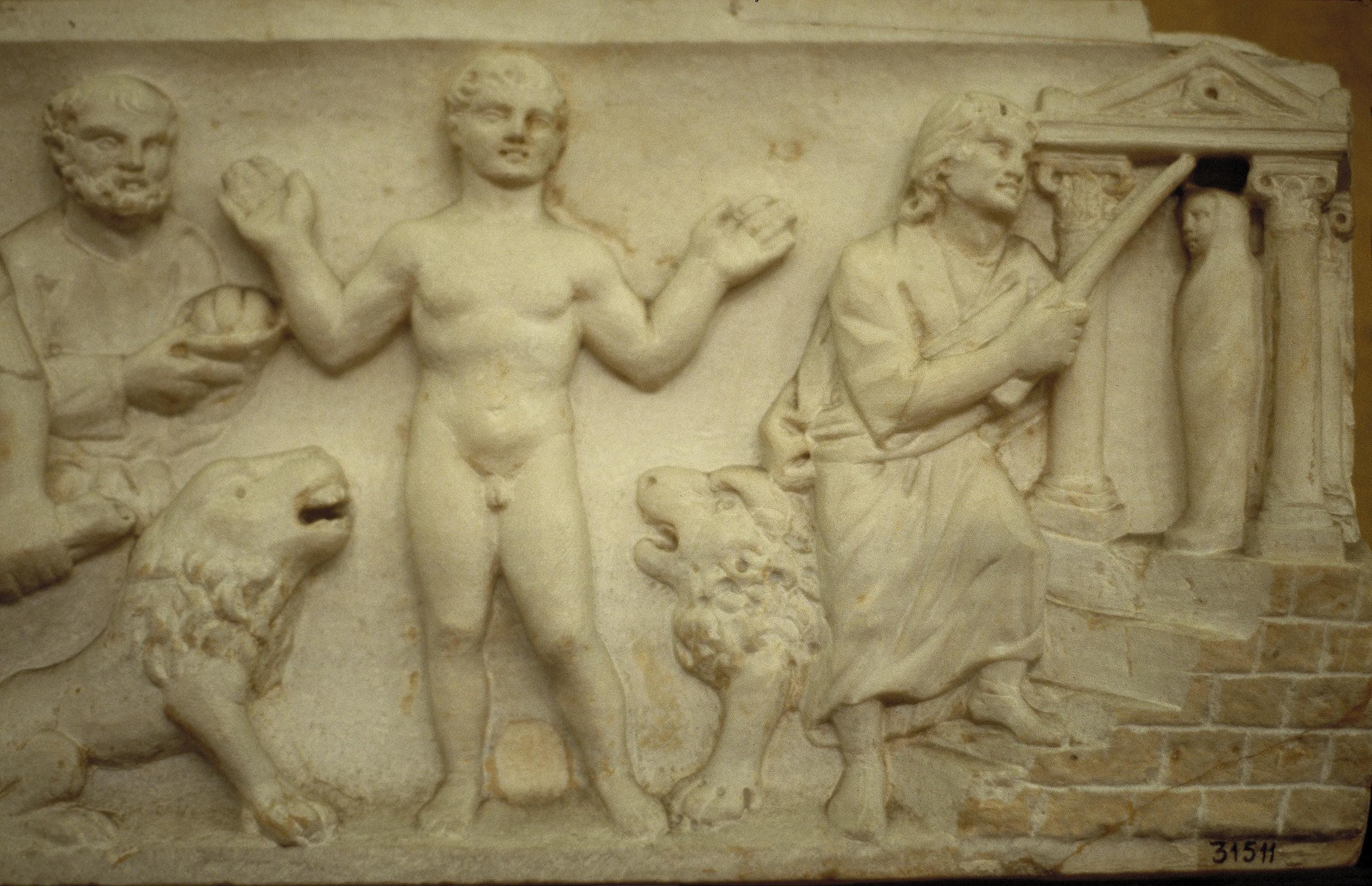
Sarcophagus relief: Daniel in the Lions Den and the Raising of Lazarus

By the 1st century AD, the wand was a common symbol of magic in Roman cults, especially Mithraism. In the 3rd and 4th centuries, there are frequent depictions on sarcophagi of Jesus Christ according to one opinion using a magic wand to perform miracles, such as the raising of Lazarus and feeding the multitude. Others scholars disagree with that, claiming that these objects are staffs since images of Christ with it "appear alongside images of Moses performing miracles with the staff".

Italian fairy tales put wands into the hands of the powerful fairies by the Late Middle Ages.

== Mystical and religious usage ==
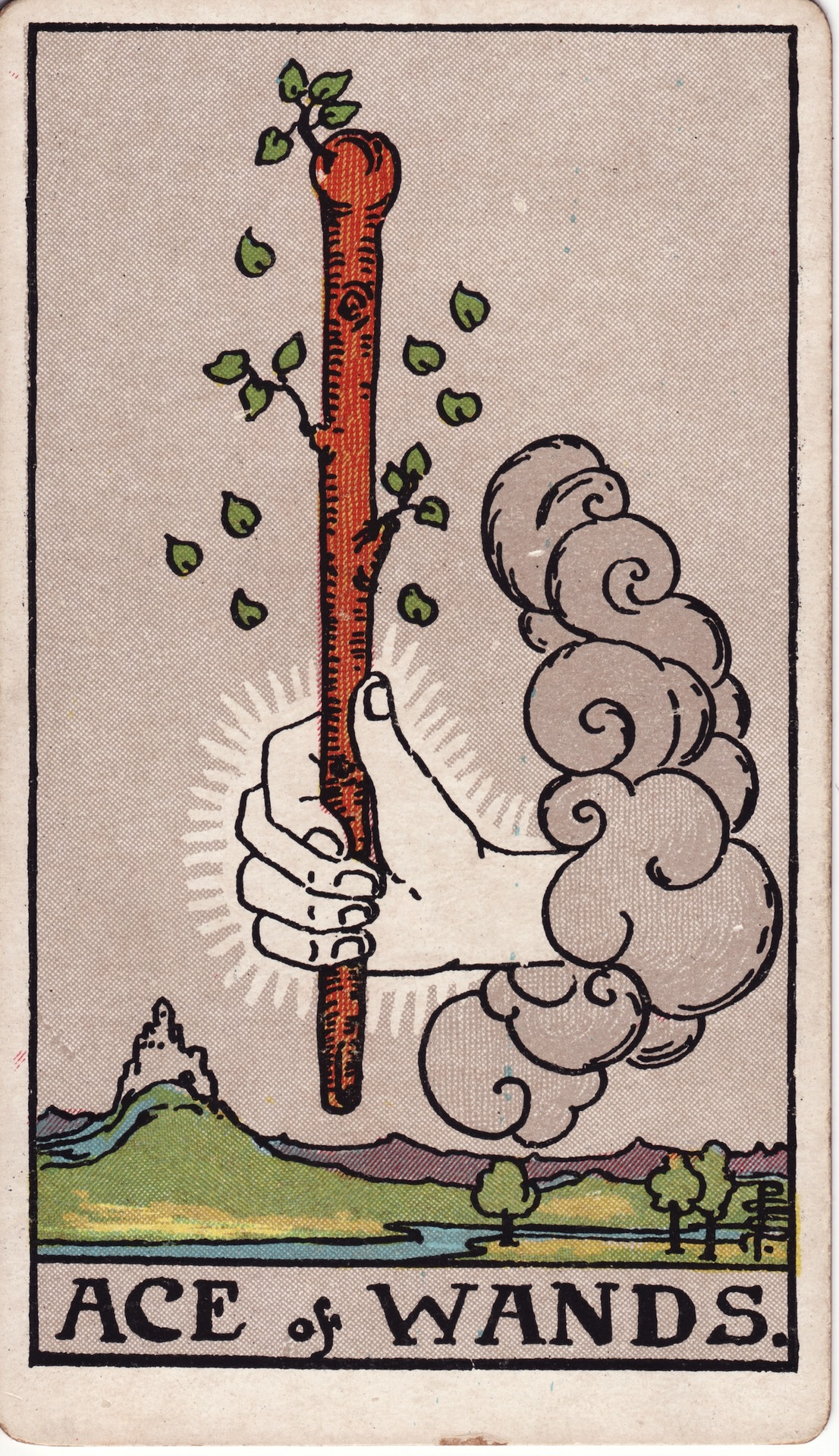
Ace of Wands from the Rider–Waite tarot deck

Wands are used in the Enochian magic of John Dee, the Hermetic Order of the Golden Dawn, Thelema, and Wicca, and by independent practitioners of magic.

Wands were introduced into the occult via the 13th-century Latin grimoire The Oathbound Book of Honorius. The wand idea from the Book of Honorius, along with various other ideas from that grimoire, were later incorporated into the 16th-century grimoire The Key of Solomon. The Key of Solomon became popular among occultists for hundreds of years. In 1888, there was the publication of an English translation of the Key of Solomon by Samuel Mathers (one of the co-founders of the Hermetic Order of the Golden Dawn), which made the text of the Key of Solomon available to the anglophone world. That 1888 English version inspired Gerald Gardner, the creator of Wicca, to incorporate the wand and various other ritual objects into Wicca.

The creators of the Golden Dawn got their idea to use a wand, as well as their other main ritual objects (dagger, sword, hexagrammic pentacle, and cup), from the writings of the mid-19th-century occult writer Eliphas Levi. Levi himself mentioned most of those objects (all except for the cup) in his writings because they are in the Key of Solomon, whereas he got the cup from the tarot suit of cups. In Levi's 1862 book Philosophie Occulte, he wrote a fake excerpt of a Hebrew version of the Key of Solomon, and that fake excerpt was part of the inspiration for the Golden Dawn's ritual objects, and especially their lotus wand.

The ceremonial magic of the Hermetic Order of the Golden Dawn uses several different types of wands for different purposes, the most prominent of which are the fire wand and the lotus wand. In Wicca, wands are traditionally used to summon and control angels and genies, but have later come to also be used for general spell-casting. Wands serve a similar purpose to athames (ritual daggers), though the two objects have their distinct uses: an athame is used to command, whereas a wand is seen as more gentle, and is used to invite or encourage.

Wands are traditionally made of wood—practitioners usually prune a branch from an oak, hazel, or other tree, or may even buy wood from a hardware store, and then carve it and add decorations to personalize it, though one can also purchase ready-made wands. In Wicca, the wand can represent the element air, or fire (following the wiccan author Raymond Buckland, who got his element associations from the Golden Dawn), although contemporary wand-makers also create wands for the elements of earth and water.

=== Tarot cards ===
The suit of wands is one of the four suits in the 1909 Rider–Waite–Smith occult tarot deck, and other, later tarot decks that are based upon that deck. The suit of wands replaced the suit of batons from earlier, non-occult tarot decks. Waite–Smith tarot deck also replaced the suit of coins from earlier, non-occult decks, with the suit of pentacles. The Rider–Waite–Smith tarot deck was designed by two members of the Hermetic Order of the Golden Dawn, Arthur Edward Waite and Pamela Colman Smith. Waite provided the general guidelines for the deck (including the names of the four suits, and thus the suit of wands), and detailed guidelines for the designs of the Major Arcana, and he hired Smith to do the painting, and to make original artwork for the Minor Arcana. Waite instructed Smith to not paint actual wands in the wand cards, but rather to paint large tree trunk staffs with some foliage growing on them, so as to make an association between wands and Eliphas Levi's phrase "the flowering rod of Aaron" from Levi's fake fragment of The Key of Solomon.

== Status symbolism ==
In British formal government ceremony, special officials may carry a wand of office that represents their power. Compare in this context the function of the ceremonial mace, the scepter, and the staff of office. Its age may be even greater, as Stone Age cave paintings show figures holding sticks, which may be symbolic representations of their power. The association with power may be its use for corporal punishment.

== Fiction ==
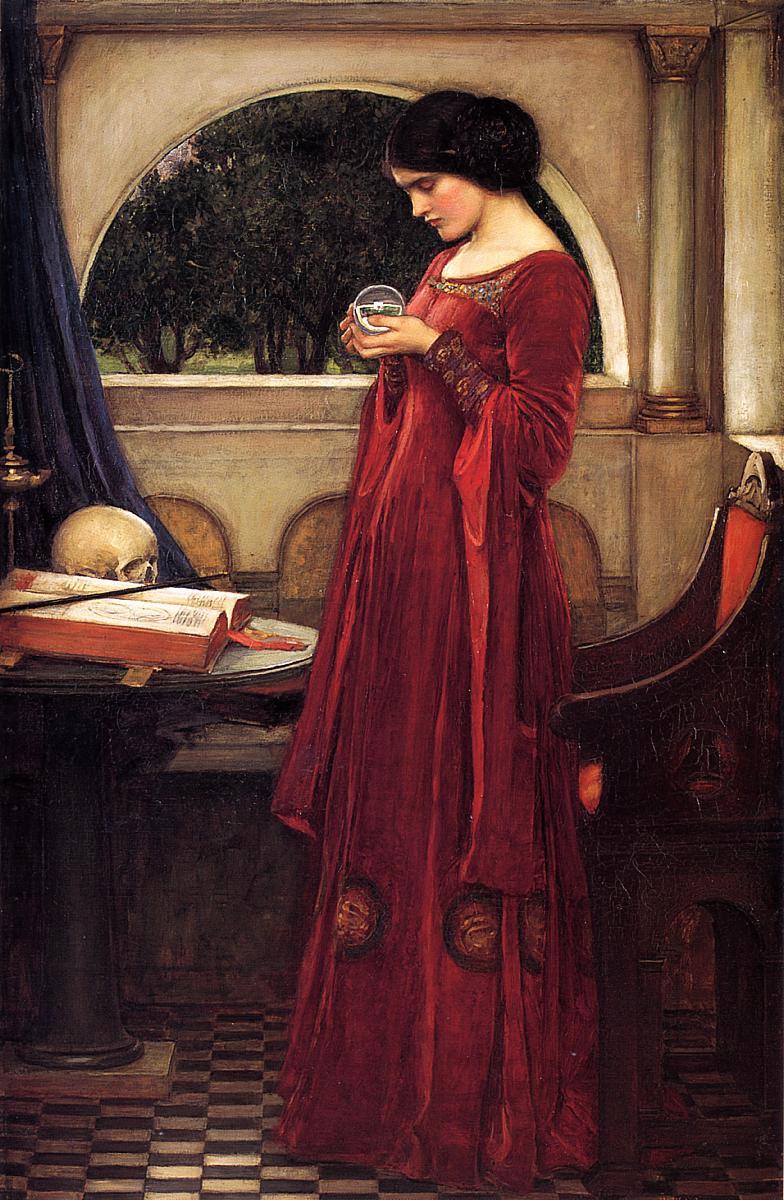
The Crystal Ball, by John William Waterhouse (1902), depicts a wand atop a book of ceremonial magic.

In the 18th-century ballads "Allison Gross" and "The Laily Worm and the Machrel of the Sea", the villainesses use silver wands to transform their victims into animals, in emulation of the Odyssey that preceded them. In C. S. Lewis's 1950 novel The Lion, the Witch and the Wardrobe, the White Witch's most feared weapon is her wand, whose magic is capable of turning people into stone. This, again, employs the Odysseyan motif of an evil female witch who uses a magic wand to maliciously transform her victims.

In the mid-20th century, the MGM and Disney media companies popularized magic wands via four films in which wands were wielded by benevolent female fairy characters. Those films were The Wizard of Oz (1939; MGM; a wand-staff was wielded by Glinda the Good Witch of the North), Pinocchio (1940; Disney; a wand was wielded by the Blue Fairy), Cinderella (1950; Disney; a wand was wielded by a fairy godmother), and Sleeping Beauty (1959; Disney; a wand was wielded by each of three fairies). In The Wizard of Oz and Pinocchio, the fairies' wands are embellished with a star-shaped ornament on the end, whereas in Cinderella and Sleeping Beauty, the fairies have wands with traditional plain tips.

Magic wands commonly feature in works of fantasy fiction as spell-casting tools. Few other common denominators exist, so the capabilities of wands vary wildly. In J. K. Rowling's Harry Potter series, the first book of which was published in 1997, personal wands are common as necessary tools to channel and project each character's magic, they are used as weapons in magical duels, and it is the wand that chooses its owner. A wand is also present in the Children of the Red King series in the possession of Charlie Bone as well as the popular MMORPG World of Warcraft where caster classes such as the mage and warlock use wands offensively.

Magic wands and staves are often used in the magical girl genre of anime and manga (or other media) as well.

== Other usage ==
Based on their magical symbolism, stage magicians often use "magic wands" as part of their misdirection. These wands are traditionally short and black, with white tips. A magic wand may be transformed into other items, grow, vanish, move, display a will of its own, or behave magically in its own right. A classic magic trick makes a bouquet of flowers shoot out of the wand's tip.

== See also ==
- Distaff
- Rhabdomancy
- Staff of Moses
- White Rod
