= The Siren (Waterhouse painting) =

Painting by John William Waterhouse

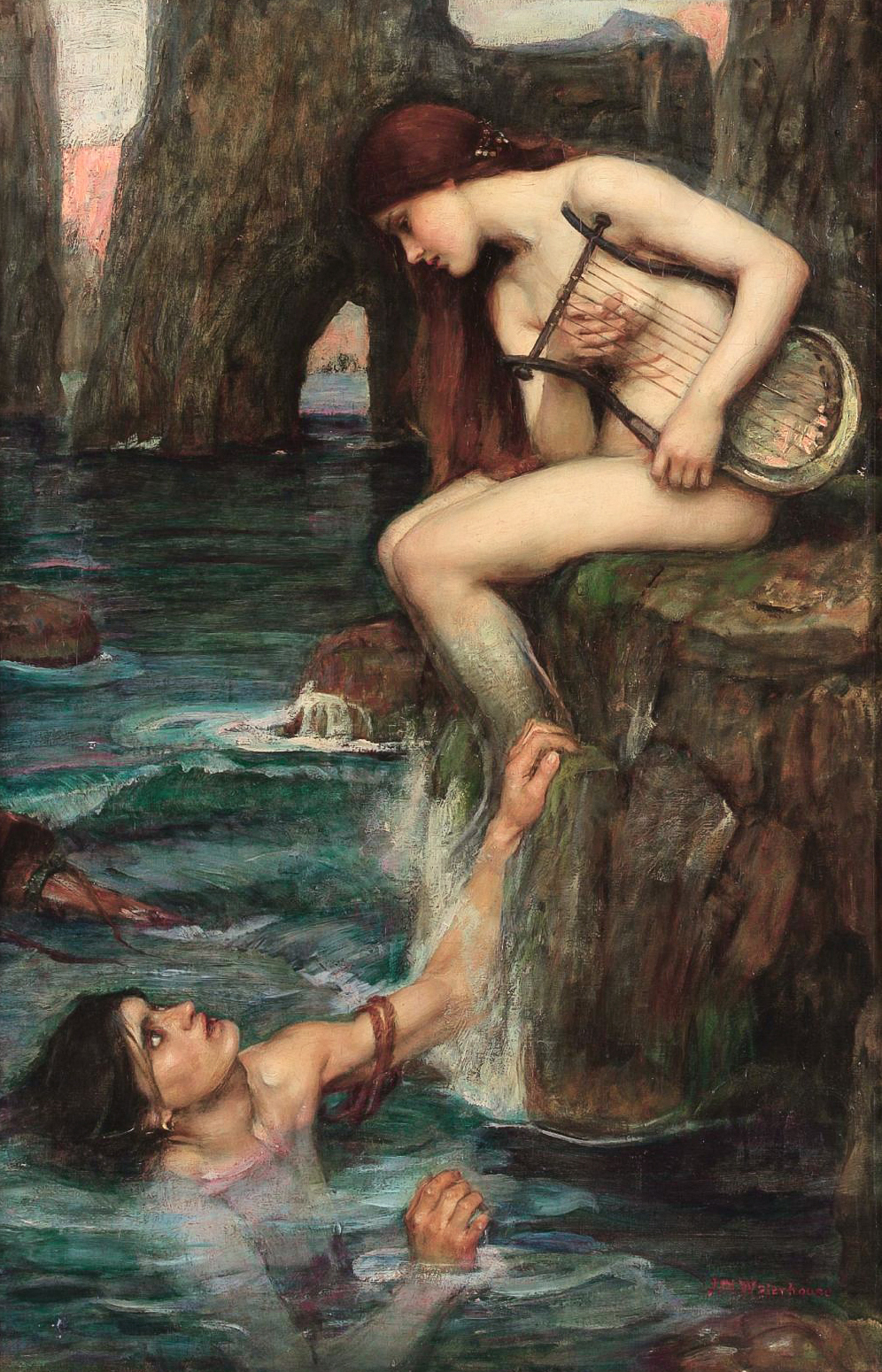
- Artist: John William Waterhouse
- Year: circa 1900
- Dimensions: 81 cm × 53 cm (32 in × 21 in)

The Siren is a painting by John William Waterhouse. The painting depicts a siren sitting at the edge of a cliff, lyre in hand, staring down at a shipwrecked sailor floating in water, who in turn is staring up at her.

The picture was painted in 1900 and is now part of a private collection. The estimated sales price for the painting in 2003 was one million pounds.

It was last sold in 2018 by Seymour Stein for about five million USD.

== See also ==
- List of paintings by John William Waterhouse
