= Boreas (painting) =

Painting by John William Waterhouse

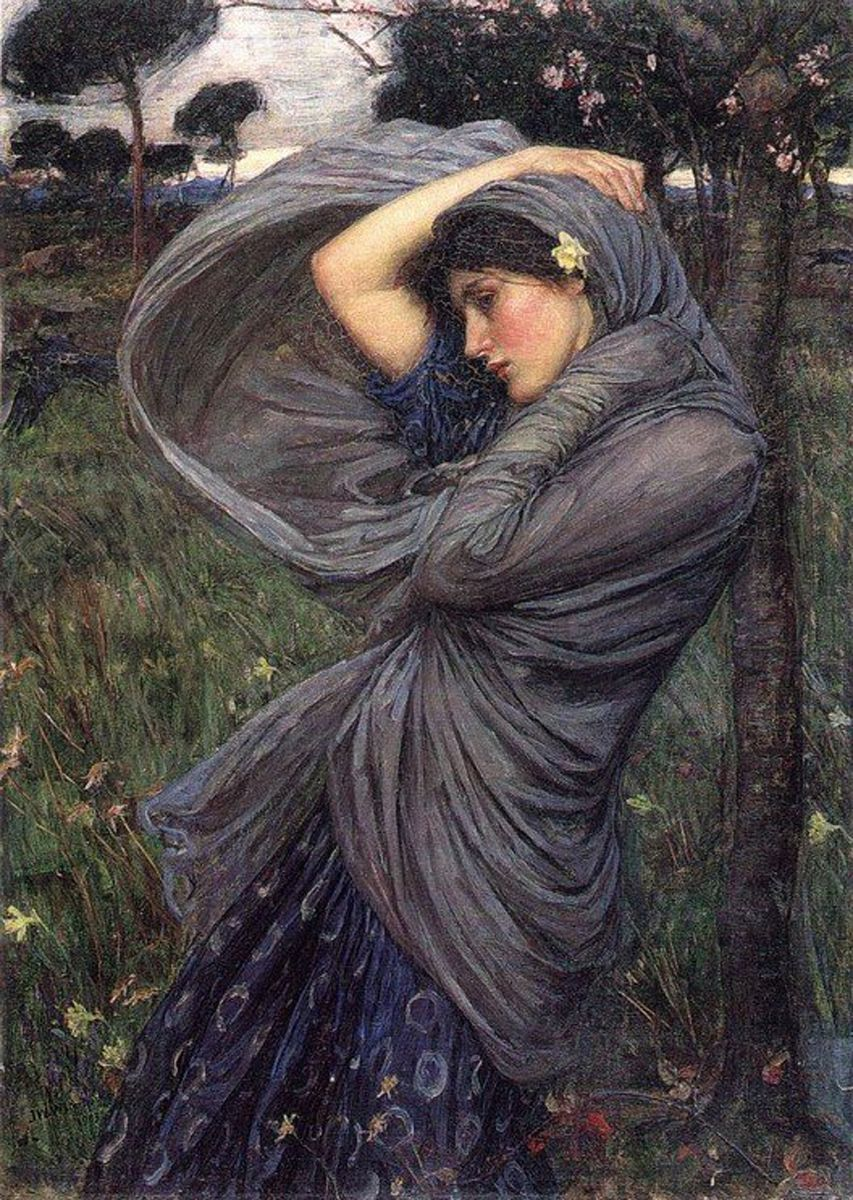
- Artist: John William Waterhouse
- Year: 1903
- Medium: Oil on canvas
- Location: Private collection

Boreas is an oil painting in the Pre-Raphaelite style created in 1903 by John William Waterhouse.

== Subject ==
The painting is titled Boreas, after the Greek god of the north wind, and it shows a young girl buffeted by the wind. The 1904 Royal Academy notes described the subject of the painting as:

In wind-blown draperies of slate-colour and blue, a girl passes through a spring landscape accented by pink blossom and daffodils.

== Provenance ==
Boreas was put up for sale in the mid-1990s after having been lost for 90 years – causing quite a sensation in the art community. The painting achieved a record price for Waterhouse at that time, £848,500 ($1,294,000 USD).

== See also ==
- List of paintings by John William Waterhouse
