= Circe Invidiosa =

Painting by John William Waterhouse

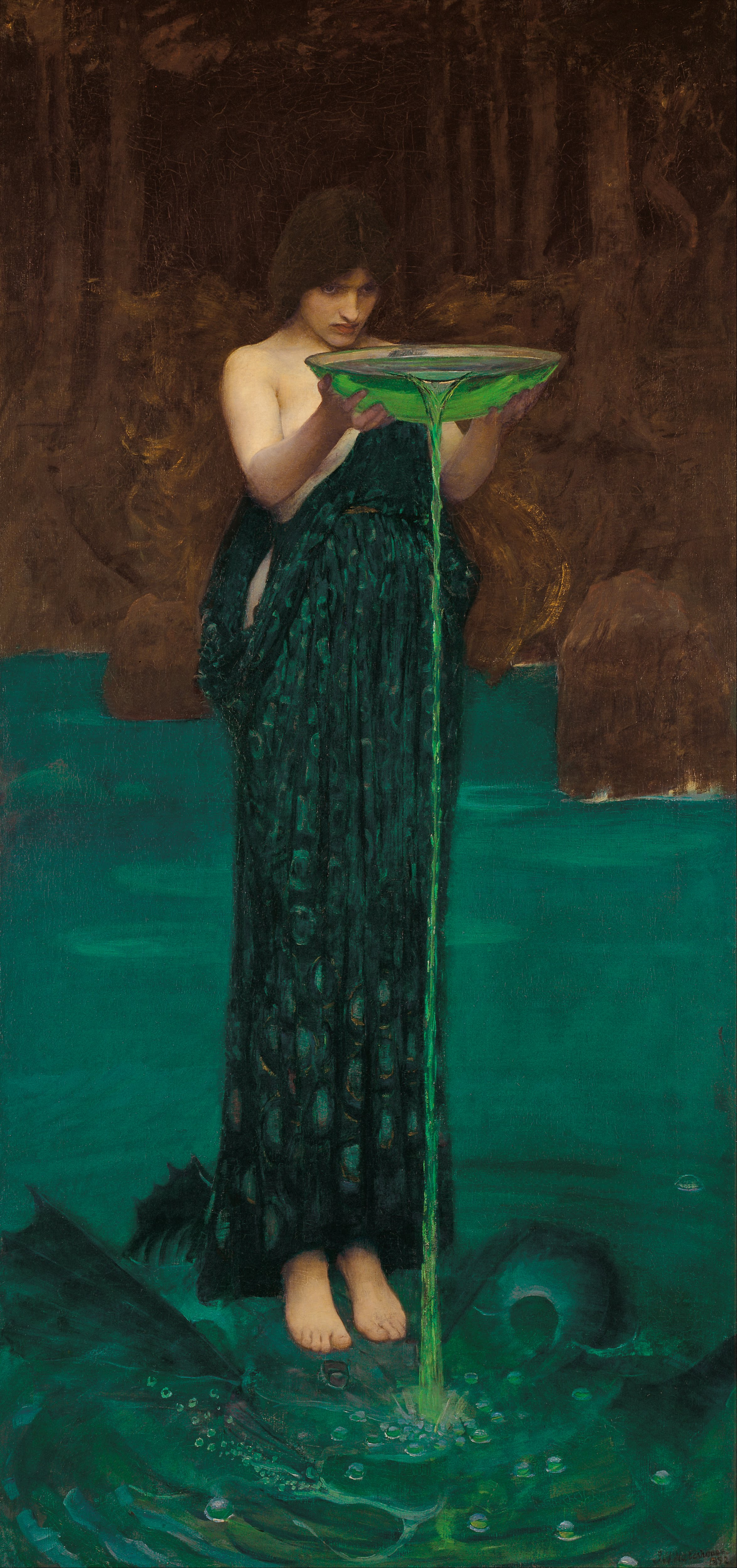
- Artist: John William Waterhouse
- Year: 1892
- Medium: Oil on canvas
- Dimensions: 179 cm × 85 cm (70 in × 33 in)
- Location: Art Gallery of South Australia, Adelaide

Circe Invidiosa is a painting by John William Waterhouse completed in 1892. It is his second depiction, after Circe Offering the Cup to Ulysses (1891), of the classical mythological character Circe. This mythological portrayal is based on Ovid's tale in Metamorphoses, wherein Circe turns Scylla into a sea monster, solely because Glaucus scorned the enchantress' romantic advances in hopes of attaining Scylla's love instead. Waterhouse later returned to the subject of Circe a third time with The Sorceress (1911). Circe Invidiosa is part of the collection of the Art Gallery of South Australia, which also owns Waterhouse's 1883 The Favourites of the Emperor Honorius.

== Description ==
The myth of Circe, Glaucus, and Scylla originates in Book XIV of Metamorphoses. The specific scene that Waterhouse bases this painting on occurs in lines 52–65 of the epic poem:

There was a cove,
a little inlet shaped like a bent bow,
a quiet place where Scylla, at midday,
sought shelter when the sea and sky were hot;
and, in midcourse, the sun scorched with full force,
reducing shadows to a narrow thread.
And Circe now contaminates this bay,
polluting it with noxious poisons; there
she scatters venom drawn from dreadful roots
and, three-times-nine times, murmurs an obscure
and tangled maze of words, a labyrinth—
the magic chant that issues from her lips.
Then Scylla comes; no sooner has she plunged
waist-deep into the water than she sees,
around her hips, the horrid barking shapes.

Waterhouse's version similarly shows Circe floating over the water in the cove, pouring bright green poison into the pool below. Under her feet, Scylla's "barking shapes" already swirl in the bubbling depths below; the transformation is well underway. Neither Scylla's human form nor her monster form is the emphasis here. Rather, the power of Circe's grave face and tangible jealousy rules this scene, as the vivid colors swirl all around her figure.

== Analysis ==
While this painting is a homage to Ovid, Waterhouse spins the classical in imaginative and poetic ways. Anthony Hobson describes the painting as being "invested with an aura of menace, which has much to do with the powerful colour scheme of deep greens and blues [Waterhouse] employed so well." Those colors are "near stained glass or jewels", according to Gleeson White. Judith Yarnall also echoes the sentiment about the colors and mentions an "integrity of line" in the painting. She says that taken as a pair, Waterhouse's first two Circes prompt the question: "is she goddess or woman?" Circe Invidiosa exemplifies Waterhouse's experimentation with the femme fatale archetype, which pervaded an immense amount of late nineteenth-century art. However, Chris Woods argues Waterhouse's portrayals of Circe are not wholly evil, destructive, or monstrous, much like one sees in paintings of female mythological figures by Gustave Moreau or other European Symbolists. In this painting, Circe becomes a tragic figure: she "cannot help what [she is] doing, and rather regret[s] it."

== See also ==
- Circe in the arts
- List of paintings by John William Waterhouse
