= In the Peristyle =

Painting by John William Waterhouse

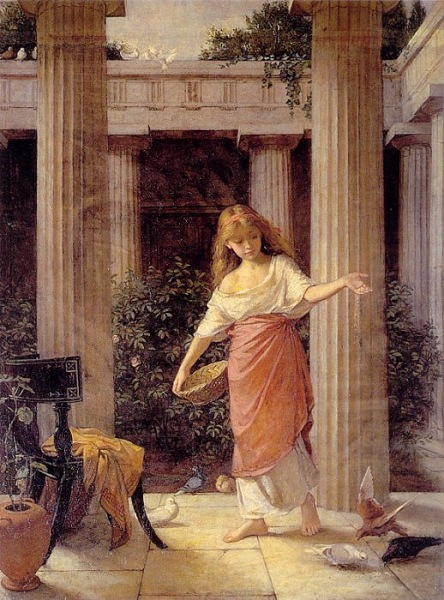
- Artist: John William Waterhouse
- Year: 1874
- Medium: Oil on canvas
- Dimensions: 67.3 cm × 52.1 cm (26.5 in × 20.5 in)

In the Peristyle by John William Waterhouse was painted in 1874 during the artist's romantic period. It is currently in the Rochdale Art Gallery.

The painting depicts a girl in classical dress feeding doves in a peristyle. Beside her to the right is a potted plant and a painted chair with some cloth, presumably an item of clothing, draped over it. Behind her is some foliage within the peristyle, and more birds sit on the roof which is partially covered by some more foliage from a tree.

A peristyle is a series of columns within a building surrounding a space such as a courtyard or garden.

== See also ==
- List of paintings by John William Waterhouse
