= Pandora (painting) =

Painting by John William Waterhouse

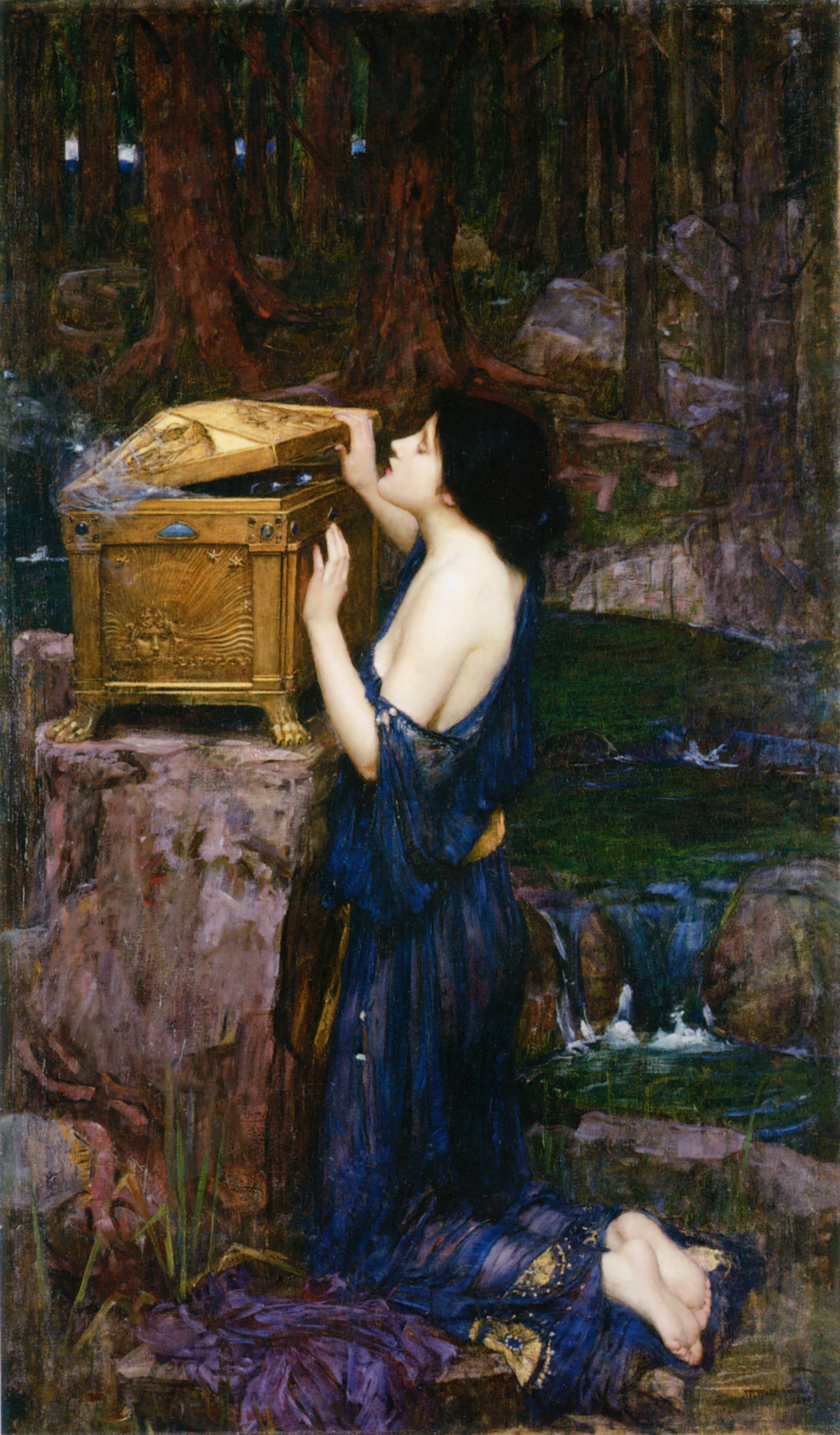
- Artist: John William Waterhouse
- Year: c.1896
- Medium: oil on canvas
- Dimensions: 152 cm × 91 cm (60 in × 36 in)
- Location: Private collection

Pandora is a c.1896 painting by John William Waterhouse, now in a private collection.

The painting is titled Pandora in honor of Pandora, the first woman according to Greek mythology. Created by order of Zeus to introduce all evil into the lives of men, after Prometheus, against divine will, gave them the gift of fire.

The recreated moment is the one in which Pandora is about to open the chest that contained the evils of the human race (old age, illness, passion, poverty and others).

Her curiosity caused everyone except Hope to run away and spread out into the world.

The theme, widely represented since Antiquity, was also illustrated by Pre-Raphaelite painter Dante Gabriel Rossetti in his work Pandora.

== See also ==
- List of paintings by John William Waterhouse
