= The Favourites of the Emperor Honorius =

Painting by John William Waterhouse

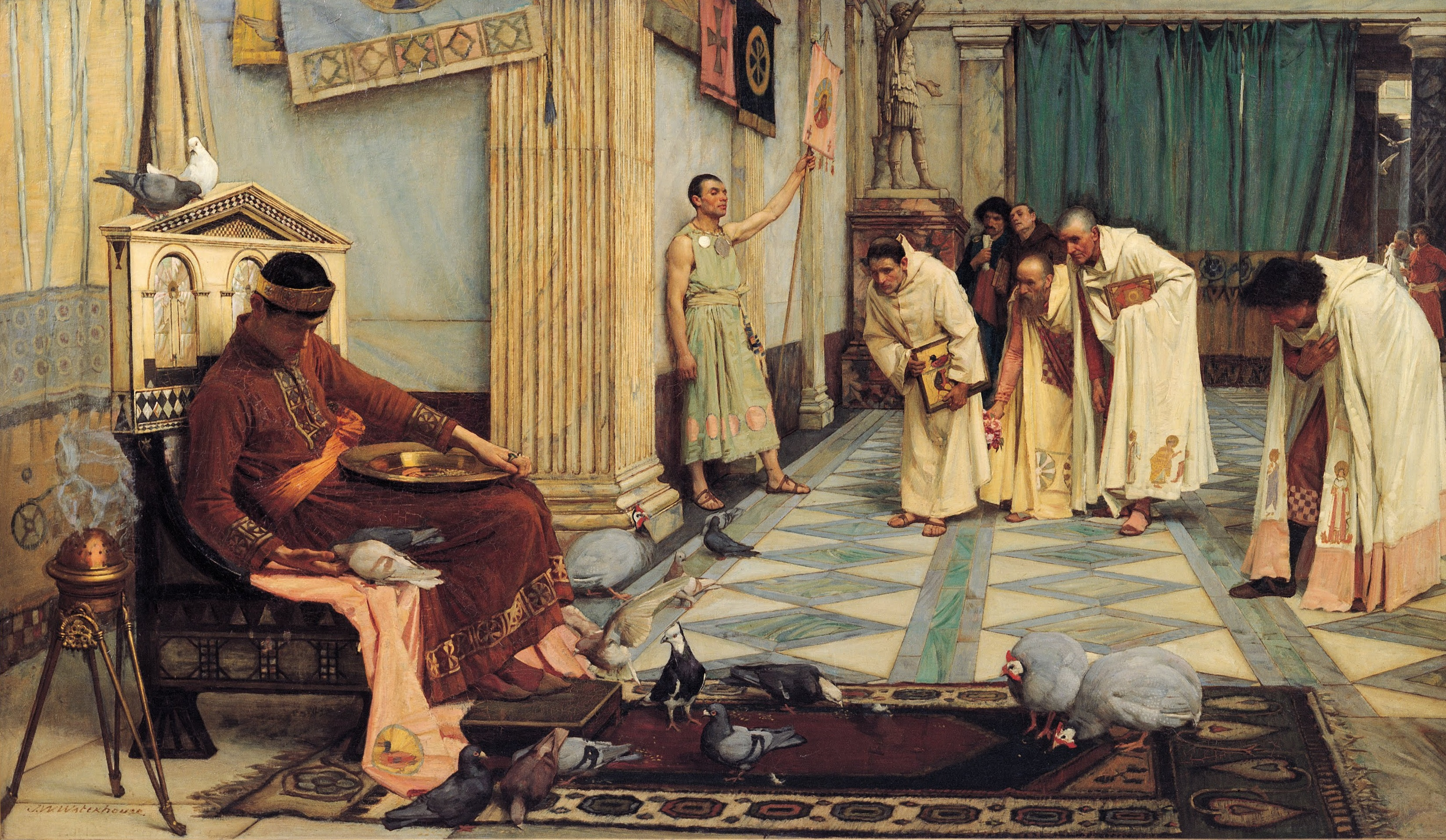
- Artist: John William Waterhouse
- Year: 1883
- Medium: Oil on canvas
- Dimensions: 117 cm × 202 cm (46 in × 80 in)
- Location: Art Gallery of South Australia; Adelaide

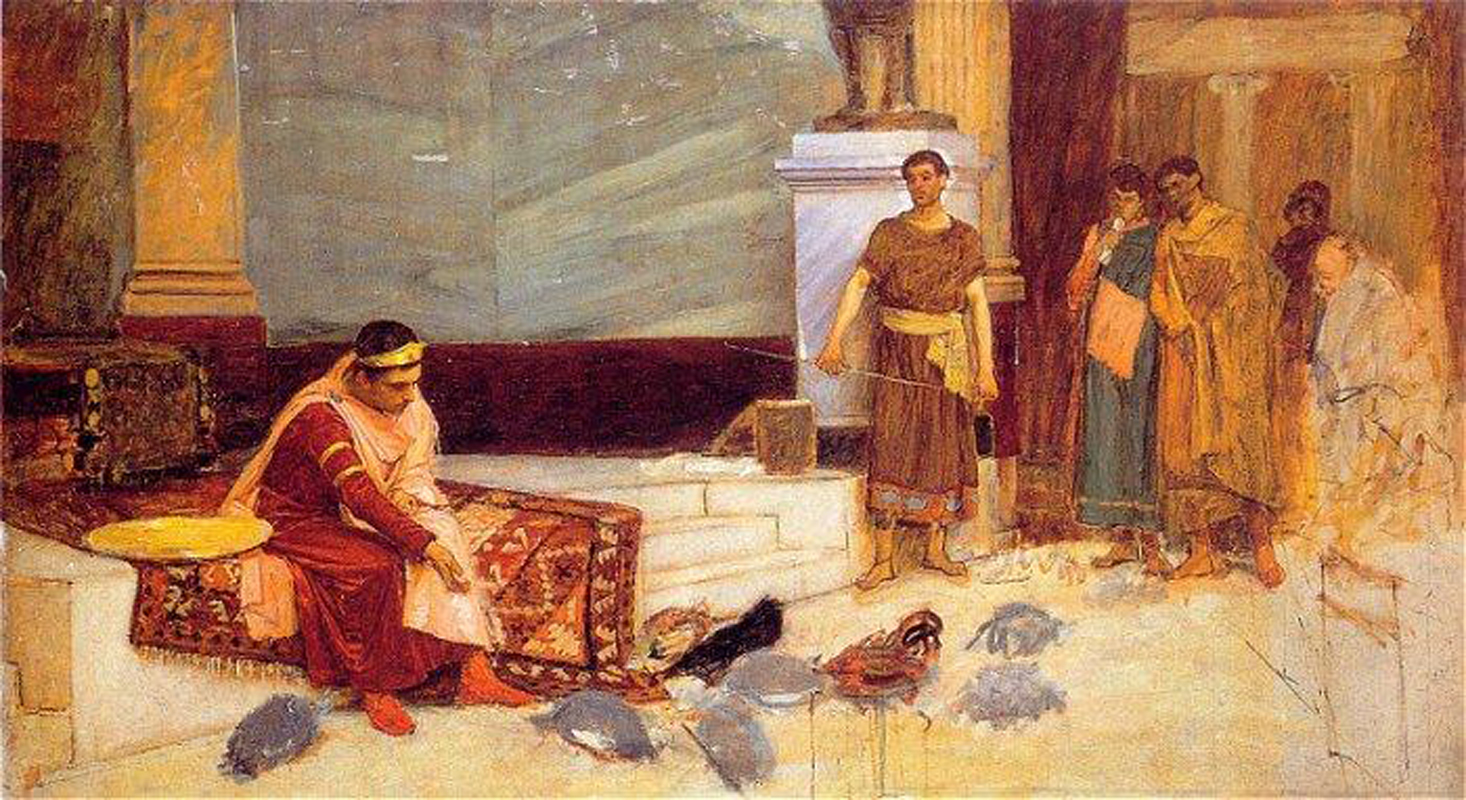
Study for The Favourites of the Emperor Honorius

The Favourites of the Emperor Honorius is a painting by John William Waterhouse completed in 1883. The painting depicts Honorius feeding birds which are on the rug in front of him; the dark colours of the rug and his clothes define a space. Separated from him and the birds are the councillors seeking his attention, and who along with the attendant are dressed in paler shades.

The Favourites of the Emperor Honorius is part of the collection of the Art Gallery of South Australia, which also owns Waterhouse's 1892 Circe Invidiosa.

Honorius was named Western Emperor at the age of 10, after the death of his father Theodosius I. During his reign, from 393 to 423, the territory of Western Roman Empire was invaded by foreign tribes and the city of Rome was sacked by the Visigoths. Honorius is considered one of the weakest Roman emperors and one of the factors in the empire's demise. Waterhouse shows him here with his childhood favorite hobby, instead of promptly attending to affairs of state, and may be alluding to an apocryphal story, mentioned by Procopius in his History of the Wars where, on hearing the news that Rome had "perished", Honorius was initially shocked, thinking the news was in reference to a favourite chicken he had named "Roma".

== See also ==
- List of paintings by John William Waterhouse
