= The Crystal Ball (painting) =

Painting by John William Waterhouse

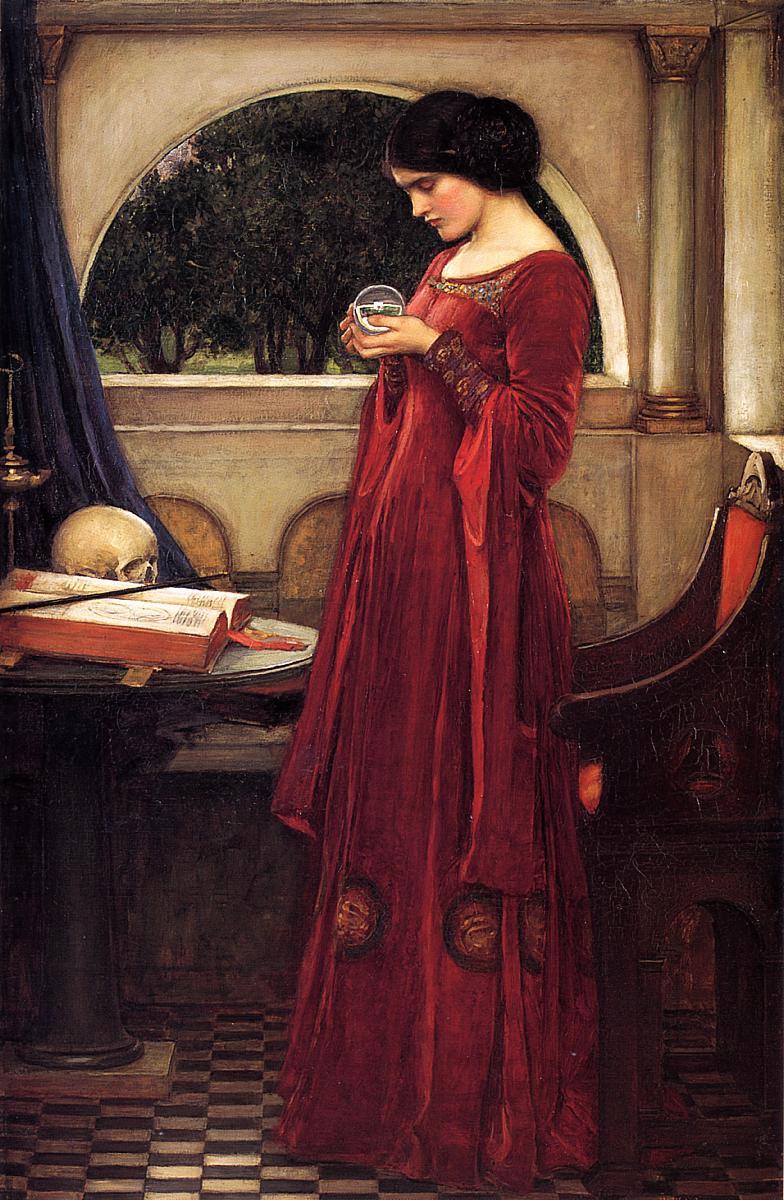
- Artist: John William Waterhouse
- Year: 1902
- Medium: Oil on canvas
- Dimensions: 120.7 cm × 87.7 cm (47.5 in × 34.5 in)
- Owner: Private collection

The Crystal Ball is a painting by John William Waterhouse completed in 1902. Waterhouse displayed both it and The Missal in the Royal Academy of 1902. The painting shows the influence of the Italian Renaissance with vertical and horizontal lines, along with circles "rather than the pointed arches of the Gothic".

Part of a private collection, the painting, which depicts a crystal ball, a wand, a book of ceremonial magic, and a woman "weaving a spell", has been restored to show the skull which had been covered by a previous owner.

== See also ==
- List of paintings by John William Waterhouse
