= Consulting the Oracle =

Painting by John William Waterhouse

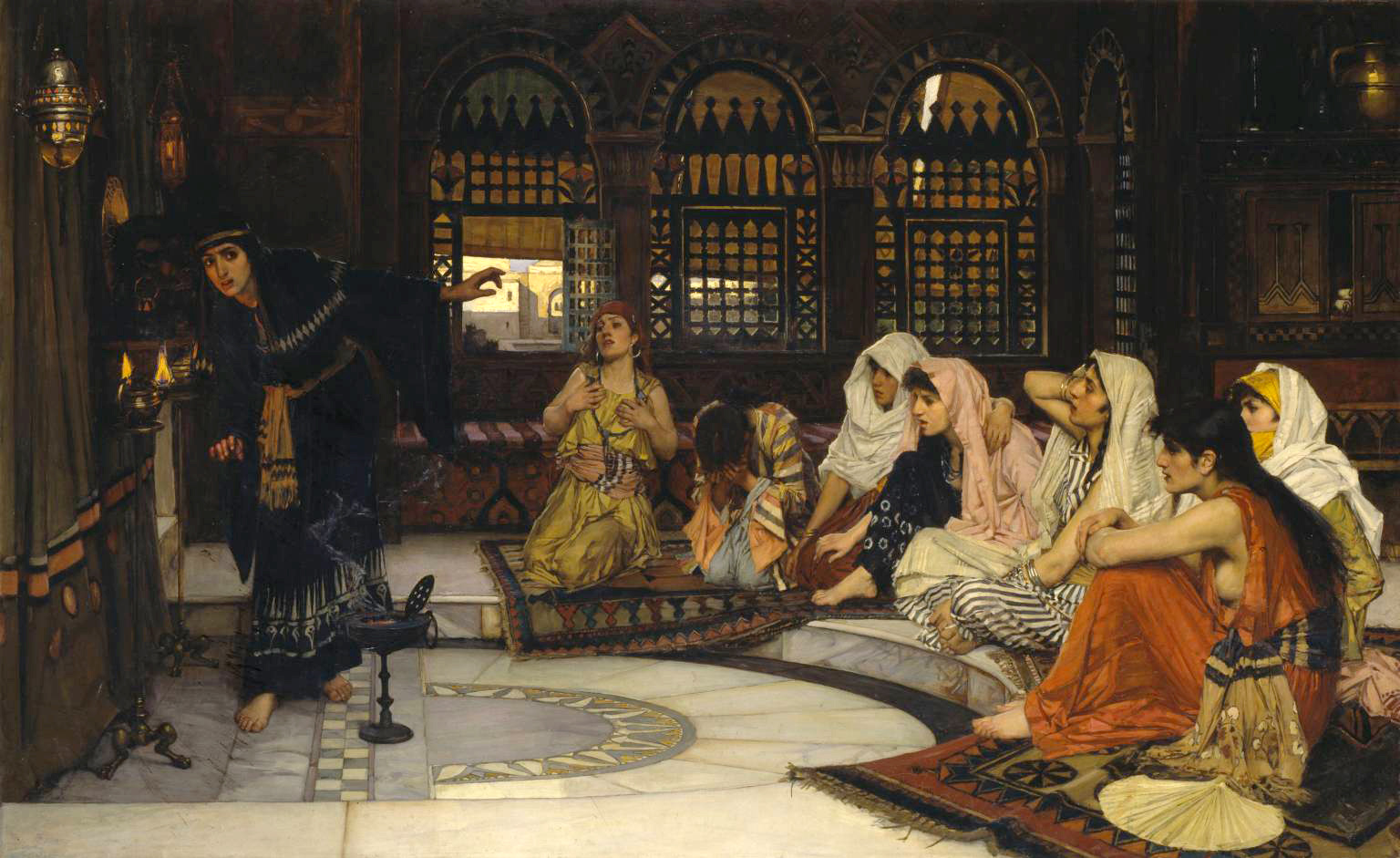
- Artist: John William Waterhouse
- Year: 1884
- Medium: Oil on canvas
- Dimensions: 119 cm × 198 cm (47 in × 78 in)
- Location: Tate Gallery; London

Consulting the Oracle is an oil on canvas painting by John William Waterhouse. Waterhouse painted it in 1884; according to Anthony Hobson, "The Illustrated London News described it as one of the principal works of the year". Hobson describes the work as having a "keyhole composition" because a partial ring of women focus upon a single other (the priestess).

Hobson goes on to say that the painting helps "to establish Waterhouse as a classical painter" because of his use of "classical, geometrical structures...the vertical, the horizontal and the circle". When he adds the diagonal, as "in the inclined figure of the priestess" and the out-of-place rug, it is a deliberately added tension.

== See also ==
- List of paintings by John William Waterhouse
