= Two Little Italian Girls by a Village =

Painting by John William Waterhouse

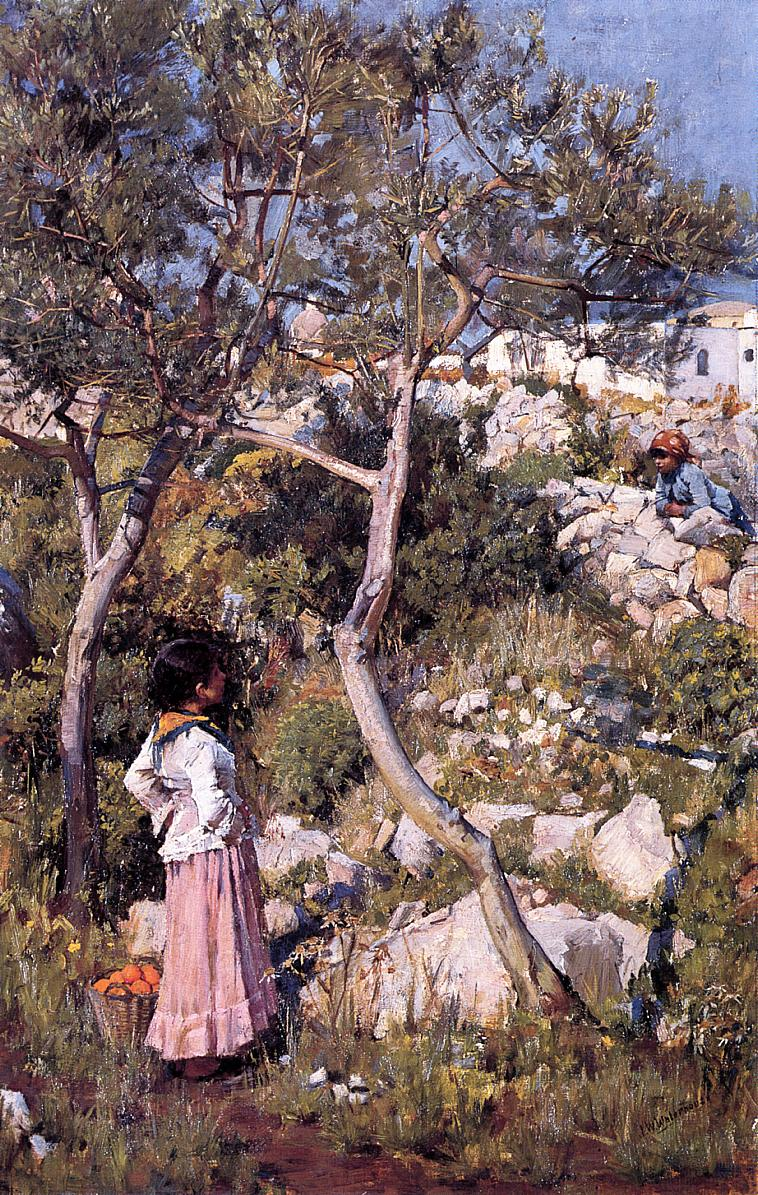
- Artist: John William Waterhouse
- Year: c. 1875 or c. 1889
- Medium: Oil on canvas
- Movement: Romanticism
- Dimensions: 60.9 cm × 40.6 cm (24.0 in × 16.0 in)
- Owner: Private collection

Two Little Italian Girls by a Village by John William Waterhouse was painted c. 1875 or c. 1889 and is currently in a private collection. Despite Waterhouse being born and raised in Rome, it was rare for him to depict related topics in his art, preferring to paint women from Greek mythology and Arthurian legend.

In this painting, Waterhouse depicts two Italian girls by a rural village during a bright, sunny time of day, featuring a cloudless sky. In the distance is the titular village. One girl stands by a basket of oranges among rocky terrain and greenery with her hands on her hips, wearing traditional clothes and looking up at the other girl, who is leaning or climbing over a stone wall and is wearing blue clothes. It can be assumed that they are conversing because of the nature of their poses and how they are facing each other.
