= After the Dance (Waterhouse painting) =

1876 painting by John William Waterhouse

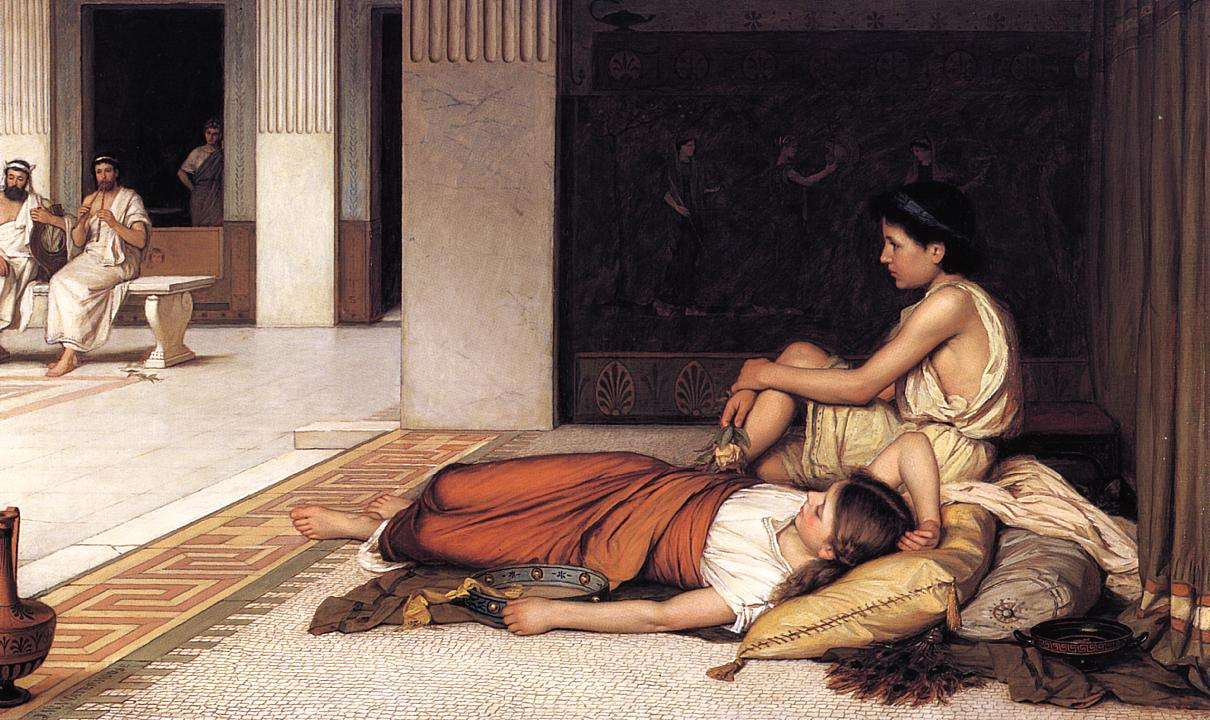
- Artist: John William Waterhouse
- Year: 1876
- Medium: Oil on canvas
- Movement: Romanticism
- Dimensions: 76.2 cm × 127 cm (30.0 in × 50 in)
- Owner: Private collection

After the Dance by John William Waterhouse was painted in 1876 during the artist's Romantic period, and is part of a private collection. The work is only the 11th of the roughly 120 well-known paintings by Waterhouse and is currently held in a private collection.

As the title suggests, the painting depicts a scene taking place after a dance. Two young people have just finished dancing and are now on the floor in the foreground, reclining on cushions. One figure, a boy, is sat with his knees drawn up, holding in one hand a yellow flower. The other is a girl laying on two pillows, a tambourine laying beside her and an orange cloth or garment draped over her lower body. In the background, two male musicians can be seen performing for the continuing out-of-view dance, the leftmost playing a lyre and the rightmost an aulos. Another man watches from the shadows behind the musicians. The setting is of a Roman interior, specifically an atrium.

The Magazine of Art 1886: Vol 9 describes the painting, then adds:

The chief points of the picture are its simplicity of scheme, its dexterous lighting, the harmonious colour, and the graceful abandon of the two dancers. There is no pretence of archeological display, nor any highly-wrought detail, or accessories introduced for the mere mastery of textures, that might disturb the impression of luxurious repose.

== See also ==
- List of paintings by John William Waterhouse
