= A Sick Child Brought into the Temple of Aesculapius =

1877 painting by John William Waterhouse

A Sick Child Brought Into The Temple Of Aesculapius
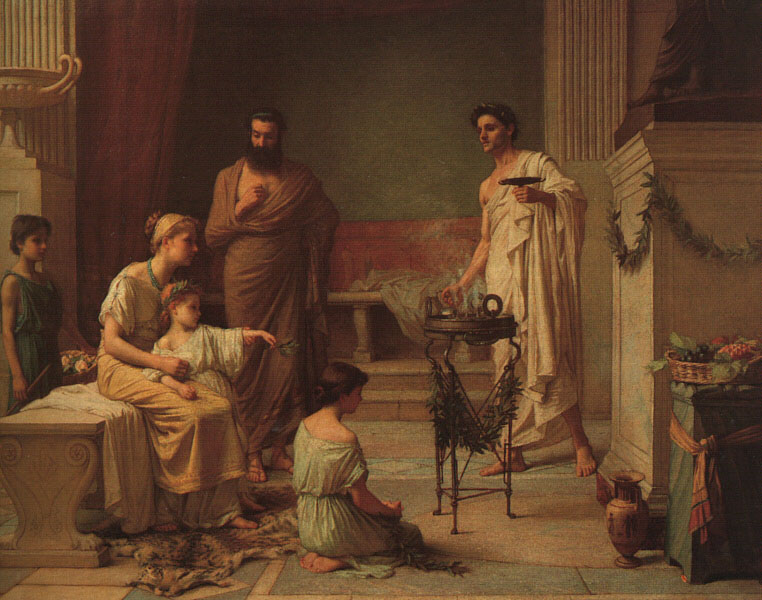
- Artist: John William Waterhouse
- Year: 1877
- Medium: Oil on canvas
- Movement: Romanticism
- Dimensions: 170 cm × 210 cm (67 in × 82 in)

A Sick Child Brought Into The Temple Of Aesculapius by artist John William Waterhouse was painted in 1877 and is currently part of a private collection. This is among one of his earlier works, before his art ventured into the Pre-Raphaelite style, depicting more classical subject matter.

Aesculapius is the Latin name for the god of medicine in Greek mythology, and the painting depicts one of his healing temples which those in the world of Ancient Greek would visit for help with their health.

There are six figures in this painting, along with the feet of a statue of Aesculapius. They all wear classical clothing. A woman sits in the temple, a feline animal pelt beneath her feet, holding a sick child who reaches out to give an offering. On the right side of the scene, a man in a white robe, presumably a temple priest, observes the child and is performing a ritualistic gesture. Behind the child stands a man in a brown robe, and behind the woman is a child wearing a green robe. A young girl kneels in front of the woman and sick child, facing the sacrificial tripod which currently burns with offerings. Laurel leaves decorate the sacrificial tripod and the pedestal, and a laurel wreath is worn by the man in white and the sick child.

== See also ==
- John William Waterhouse - A Sick Child brought into the Temple of Aesculapius (1877).jpg
- Art Renewal Center, A Sick Child Brought into the Temple of Aesculapius
