= Miranda (Waterhouse painting) =

1875 painting by John William Waterhouse

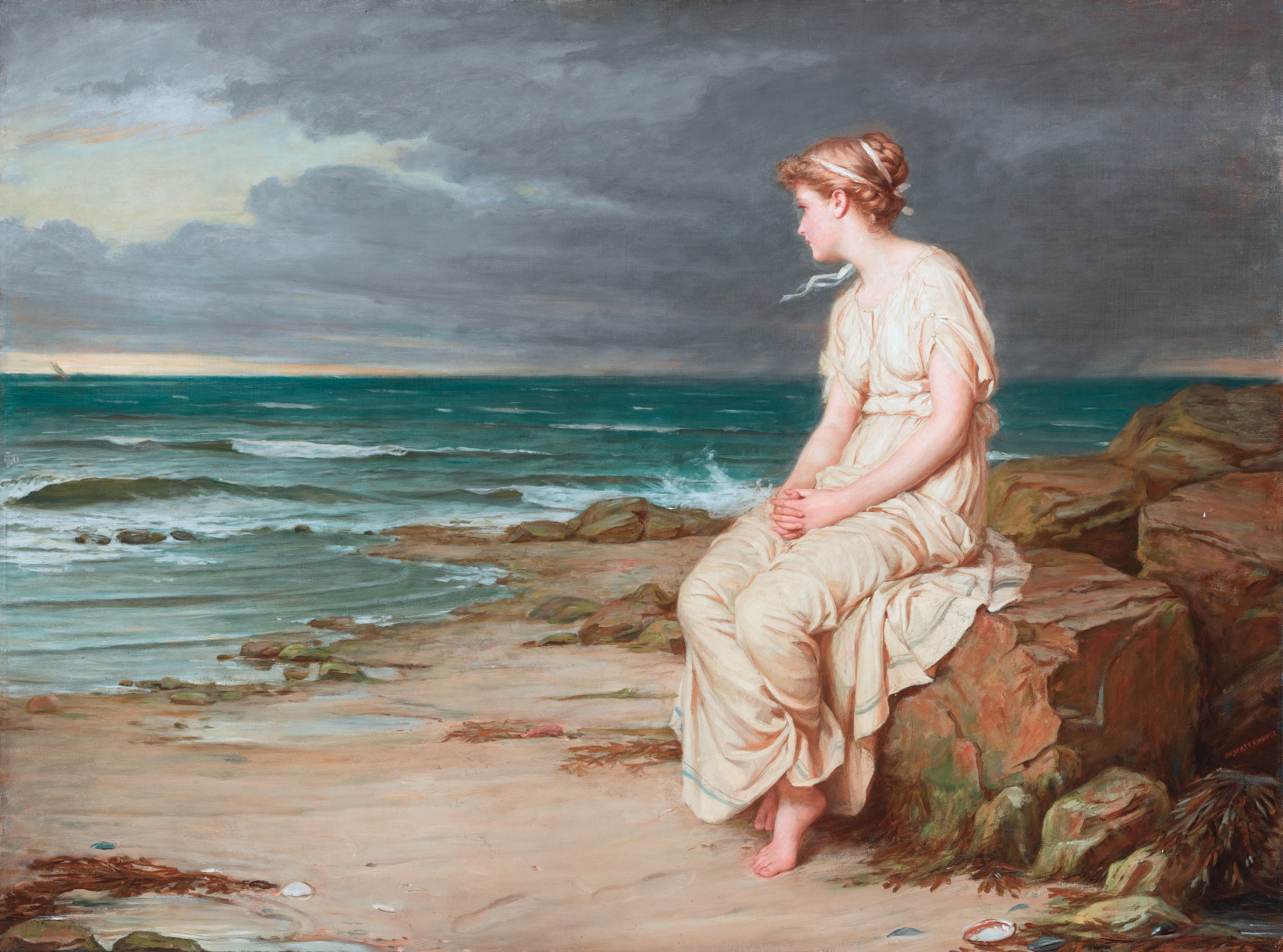
- Artist: John William Waterhouse
- Year: 1875
- Medium: Oil on canvas
- Movement: Romanticism
- Dimensions: 76 cm × 101.5 cm (30 in × 40.0 in)
- Condition: Very good condition with minimal intervention in the past.
- Owner: Private collection

Miranda by John William Waterhouse was painted in 1875 and depicts the character Miranda from William Shakespeare's The Tempest. Waterhouse also painted Miranda later in his career, both in 1916. According to Sotheby's, the painting is currently in very good condition.

Miranda was only Waterhouse's second exhibit at the Royal Academy, in 1875. It was seemingly lost for 131 years until it was found in 2004 in a private collection in Scotland, then auctioned by Bonhams on 4 November 2004. From 2009 to 2010, it went on an exhibition tour:

- The Groninger Museum (December 13, 2008 – May 3, 2009)
- The Royal Academy of Arts in London (J.W. Waterhouse - The Modern Pre-Raphaelite) (June 27 – September 13, 2009)
- The Montreal Museum of Fine Arts (October 1, 2009 – February 7, 2010)

The painting does not depict a scene from the play, but instead is an invention of Waterhouse, who depicts the fifteen-year-old Miranda seated on a rock at the seashore, watching a ship in the far distance. Despite the era the play was written in, Miranda is depicted wearing clothing from classical antiquity, a white chiton and tainia; her clothing and the scene evokes the mythical heroine Ariadne at the time when she was abandoned by Theseus on the island of Naxos. During Act I of The Tempest, Miranda will witness this ship, which carries her eventual lover Ferdinand, destroyed by the magic of her father, Prospero—this is the more popularly depicted scene, but Waterhouse chose to paint a pensive Miranda instead.

In The Magazine of Art (1886), Blaikie compares Miranda to another of Waterhouse's works, Sleep and His Half-Brother Death, to both critique and compliment the artist:

There is no suggestion of the imaginative insight and exhaustive idealisation that are notable of the vision of Sleep and Death, though a satisfying potency of colour and a finely graduated brilliance of illumination give admirable force and relief to the figure.
