= Circe Offering the Cup to Ulysses =

Painting by John William Waterhouse

Circe Offering the Cup to Odysseus
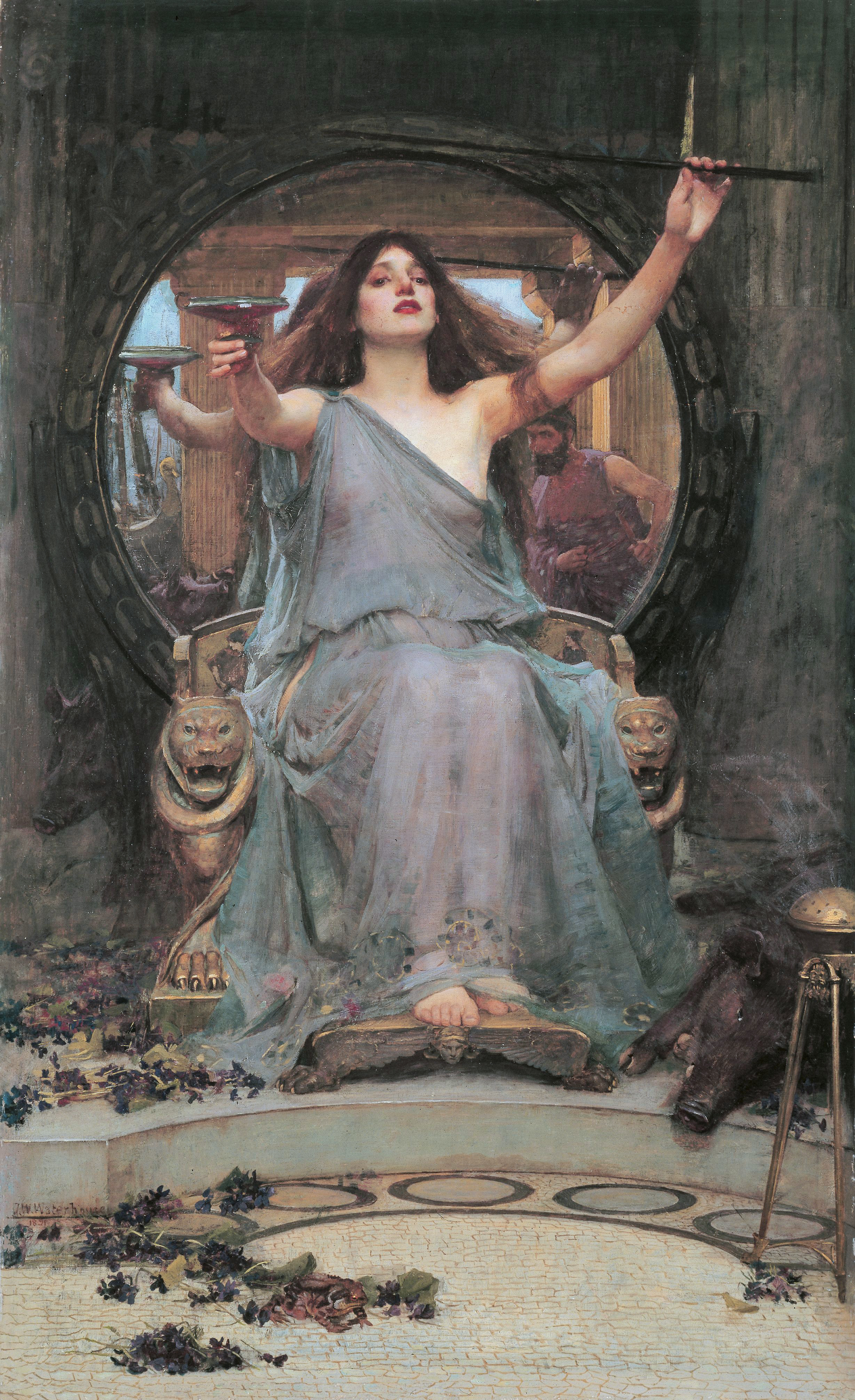
- Artist: John William Waterhouse
- Year: 1891
- Medium: Oil on canvas
- Dimensions: 148 cm × 92 cm (58 in × 36 in)
- Location: Gallery Oldham, Oldham

Circe Offering the Cup to Ulysses is an oil painting in the Pre-Raphaelite style by John William Waterhouse that was created in 1891. It is now in Gallery Oldham, Oldham, England.

== Subject ==
The painting depicts a scene from the Odyssey. Circe, a sorceress, offers a cup to Odysseus (commonly Ulysses in English). In the cup is a potion. Circe seeks to bring Ulysses under her spell, as she has done with his crew. Two of Ulysses' crewmen have been transformed into pigs; one can be seen beside Circe's feet on the right, while the other is peering out from behind her throne on the left. Ulysses' reflection can be seen in the mirror behind Circe's throne, in addition to the columns of her palace and Ulysses' ship.

Ulysses, intrepid and worried about his sailors, tries to save them and, on the way to do so, Hermes (the messenger of the immortals) intercepts him and tells him of Circe's intentions. He advises Ulysses to find a special plant that makes him immune to the effects of Circe's potion, which he proceeds to do. Under the impression that the effects of the potion have taken hold, Circe touches Ulysses with her wand to complete the transformation process. He threatens Circe with his sword; she then seduces him and coerces him into sleeping with her to return his sailors. He reluctantly agrees, and, after the arrangement is consummated, she returns his sailors to their human form.

== Mirrors ==
The trick of having a wide view shown in a large mirror behind the subject is used in other paintings by Waterhouse. It is also seen in his The Lady of Shalott Looking at Lancelot (1894) and his I Am Half-Sick of Shadows, Said the Lady of Shalott (1916). Those are both based on Tennyson's poem The Lady of Shalott, where the subject is described as weaving a tapestry of the view in her mirror (a common method still used by weavers).

== See also ==
- Circe Invidiosa, another depiction of Circe by Waterhouse
- List of paintings by John William Waterhouse
