= Gather ye rosebuds while ye may =

Gather ye rosebuds while ye may is the first line from the poem "To the Virgins, to Make Much of Time" by Robert Herrick. The words come originally from the Book of Wisdom in the Bible, chapter 2, verse 8.

It was the inspiration for several works of art:

- Gather Ye Rosebuds While Ye May (Waterhouse painting 1908) by John William Waterhouse
- Gather Ye Rosebuds While Ye May (Waterhouse painting 1909) by John William Waterhouse
