= Quo Vadis (Dyson) =

Quo Vadis is a cycle of poems for chorus and orchestra in nine movements, composed between 1936 and 1945 by George Dyson. It has been described as an "anthology cantata", using poems by multiple authors to explore a subject—in this case, "where are you going?" (the literal translation of the Latin phrase quo vadis). Christopher Palmer summed up the work's theme as "man’s earthly pilgrimage, his spiritual odyssey and its consummation in Shelley’s 'white radiance of Eternity'".

What we now know as part one was originally intended for the Three Choirs Festival on 7 September 1939, but the performance was cancelled when war was declared on 1 September. The first complete performance eventually took place in Hereford at the 1949 Festival. Lewis Foreman related the work to a movement he termed "agnostics at prayer", including other choral compositions of the period such as Sancta Civitas (Vaughan Williams, 1925), Hymnus Paradisi (Howells, 1938), Intimations of Immortality (Finzi, 1950), and Amore Langueo (Ferguson, 1955-56).

Quo Vadis was performed at the Three Choirs Festival in Hereford on 25 July, 2022.

== Sections ==
1. Our birth is but a sleep - chorus - William Wordsworth
2. Rise O my Soul - alto and semi-chorus - Sir Walter Raleigh; Thomas Campion; Thomas Heywood
3. Whither shall my troubled muse incline - bass and chorus - Barnaby Barnes; Robert Herrick; Thomas Lynch; Thomas Sternhold
4. Night hath no wings - tenor, solo viola and semi-chorus - Robert Herrick; Isaac Williams
5. Timely happy, timely wise - solo quartet, chorus, semi-chorus - John Keble
6. Dear stream, dear bank - soprano - Henry Vaughan; George Herbert
7. Come to me God - bass solo and chorus - Robert Herrick; Henry Vaughan
8. They are at rest - alto and quartet - John Henry Newman
9. To find the Western path - tenor, quartet and chorus - William Blake; Percy Bysshe Shelley; Salisbury Diurnal
