= Gather Ye Rosebuds While Ye May (Waterhouse painting 1908) =

Painting by John William Waterhouse

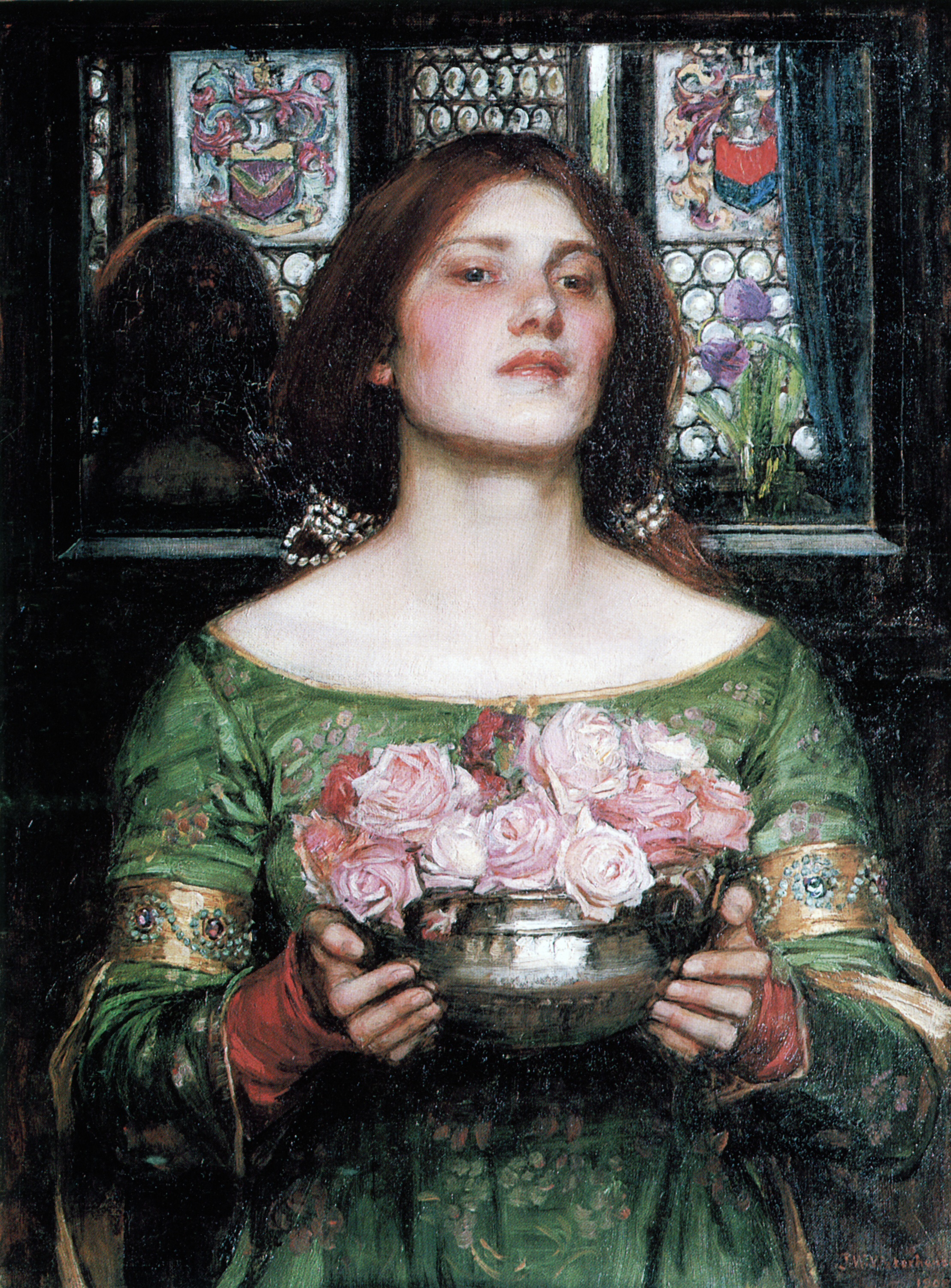
- Artist: John William Waterhouse
- Year: 1908
- Medium: Oil on canvas
- Dimensions: 61.6 cm × 45.7 cm (24.3 in × 18.0 in)
- Location: Private collection

Gather Ye Rosebuds While Ye May is an oil painting on canvas created in 1908 by British Pre-Raphaelite artist John William Waterhouse. It was the first of two paintings inspired by the 17th century poem "To the Virgins, to Make Much of Time" by Robert Herrick which begins:

Gather ye rosebuds while ye may,
Old Time is still a-flying;
And this same flower that smiles today
Tomorrow will be dying.

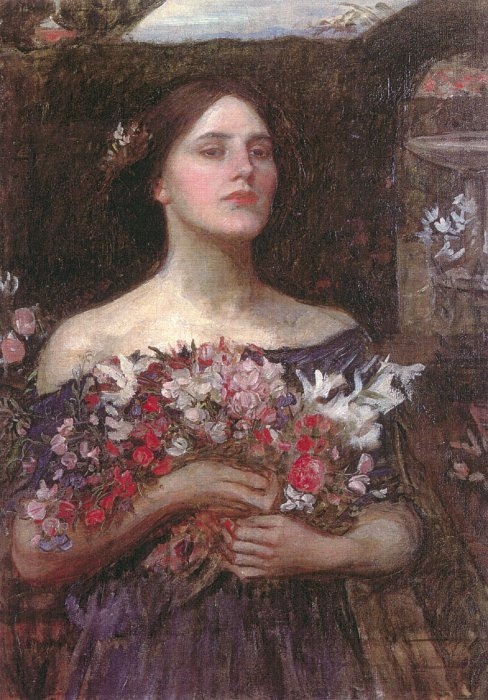
Oil study for Gather Ye Rosebuds While Ye May.

The painting has a matching oil study.

== See also ==
- Gather Ye Rosebuds While Ye May (Waterhouse painting 1909)
- List of paintings by John William Waterhouse
