= Plainsong and Medieval Music Society =

English music society

- Formation: November 1888; 137 years ago
- Type: Nonprofit organization
- Legal status: Charity
- Purpose: "exists to promote the performance and study of liturgical chant and medieval polyphony, through the publication of editions, facsimiles and scholarly articles, and through educational and liaison events."
- Headquarters: England, UK
- Key people: Adam Whittaker (chair); Henry T. Drummond (secretary); Christian Leitmeir (treasurer)
- Website: plainsong.org.uk

The Plainsong and Medieval Music Society (PMMS), also spelled as the Plainsong and Mediæval Music Society, is an English music society. Founded in 1888, the PMMS primarily researches, promotes and produces publications on medieval music, particularly the liturgical chant from that time to the present. A registered charity since 1987, it has been particularly influential in encouraging the revival of Anglican chant. Musicologists associated with the PMMS include H. B. Briggs, Anselm Hughes, G. H. Palmer, and George Ratcliffe Woodward, and more recently Gustave Reese, D. H. Turner, John Stevens, Christopher Page and Margaret Bent.

The society is best known for its publications, which number over a hundred; most of them are either essays on, or editions of, plainchant. Through Cambridge University Press, it publishes the journal Plainsong and Medieval Music twice a year, previously known as the Journal of the Plainsong & Mediaeval Music Society.

== History ==
The Plainsong and Medieval Music Society (PMMS) was founded in London in November 1888 to promote the study of medieval music and plainchant in general. This is recounted in a March 1889 issue of The Musical Times:

A SOCIETY called the Plainsonge [sic] Mediæval Society has been formed at 20, Finsbury Circus, London, for the study of music of the Middle Ages. After a catalogue of English MSS. has been compiled, it is intended to reproduce those of importance in facsmile, to publisher music which has not before been printed, to arrange for lectures by competent musicians, to correspond with similar socieites on the Continent, and in other ways to carry out the objects of the Society.

— The Musical Times, March 1889

An early 1896 PMMS publication gives the President as the 'Bishop of Salisbury', which would have been John Wordsworth at the time. The Vice-Presidents listed included several musicians and clergymen, including the Bishop of Argyll and The Isles (Alexander Chinnery-Haldane), Hickman Beckett Bacon, Frederick Bridge, Edward John Hopkins, George Martin, Henry Fleetwood Sheppard, John Stainer and Arthur Sullivan, among others. The honorary secretary from the founding until 1901 was H. B. Briggs. Among the society's many council members at the time were W. J. Birkbeck, Arthur Henry Brown, Somers Clarke, Walter Frere, John Thomas Micklethwaite, George Herbert Palmer, Athelstan Riley, Charles Francis Abdy Williams and George Ratcliffe Woodward. The PMMS began with a choir, which lasted a few decades.

The society was an important step for the growing late 19th-century interest in singing Gregorian chant in the vernacular. It was thus influential in encouraging the development of Anglican chant. Since 27 August 1987, the PMMS has been a registered charity with the Charity Commission for England and Wales; its charity number is 297147.

The musicologist Anselm Hughes was a major figure of the society; he was secretary from 1926 until 1974. Among the more recent academics associated with the PMMS are Gustave Reese, D. H. Turner, Frank Llewellyn Harrison, John Stevens, Christopher Page and John Harper. The society is currently led by a team of Officers, Executive Trustees, Advisory Trustees and Honorary Officers; chief among these are the Officers: the Chair Adam Whittaker of Royal Birmingham Conservatoire, the Secretary Henry T. Drummond of KU Leuven, and the Treasurer Christian Thomas Leitmeir of Magdalen College, Oxford.

== Publications ==
Since its inception, the society has aimed to be a central resource its disciplines, publishing facsimile manuscripts, translating non-English documents, and creating a comprehensive catalogue of all pre-Reformation plainsong and measured music composed in England. Its chief objective has always been academic scholarship, for which it is best known. By the mid-20th century, the PMMS had published around 70 items, split between plainsong essays and editions of plainsong. Among the more notable publications was a partial translation of Peter Wagner's Einführung in die gregorianischen Melodien, Frere's Graduale Sarisburiense (1892–1894), the Antiphonale Sarisburiense (1901–1924), the Bibliotheca Musico-Liturgica (1894–1901) catalogue, Early English Harmony by Harry Ellis Wooldridge and Hughes, an Old Hall Manuscript edition, Worcester Mediaeval Harmony by Hughes and Polyphonia Sacra by Van den Borren.

=== Selected publications ===
- Plainsong and Medieval Music Society (1891). A Collection of Songs and Madrigals by English Composers of the Close of the Fifteenth Century. London: Bernard Quaritch.
- Plainsong and Medieval Music Society (1896). The Plainsong of the Mass. London: Waterlow and Sons.
- Briggs, H. B. (1898). Recent Research in Plainsong: A Paper Read to the Members of the Plainsong and Mediæval Music Society. London: Vincent.
- Palmer, G. H., ed. (1899). The Order of Compline Throughout the Year: With the Musical Notation from the Salisbury Antiphoner. Oxfordshire: Wantage.
- Wagner, Peter (1901). Introduction to the Gregorian Melodies: A Handbook of Plainsong. Translated by Orme, Agnes; Wyatt, E. G. P. London: The Plainsong & Mediaeval Music Society. Originally published in German as Einführung in die gregorianischen Melodien.
- Woodward, George Ratcliffe; Petri, Didrik, eds. (1910). Piae Cantiones: A Collection of Church and School song, Chiefly Ancient Swedish, Originally Published in A.D. 1582 by Theodoric Petri of Nyland. London: Plainsong and Medieval Music Society. OCLC 3042023.
- Catalogue of Manuscripts Written or Owned in England up to 1200 Containing Music. Salisbury: Royal School of Church Music with the Plainsong and Medieval Music Society. 2005.
- Hartzell, K. D. (2006). Catalogue of Manuscripts Written or Owned in England up to 1200 Containing Music. Woodbridge: Boydell Press with the Plainsong and Medieval Music Society. ISBN 978-1-84383-281-2.

== Plainsong and Medieval Music ==
Plainsong and Medieval Music
- Discipline: Medieval music and plainchant
- Language: English
- Edited by: Catherine A. Bradley; Daniel J. DiCenso

Publication details
- History: 1978–present
- Frequency: Biannually

Standard abbreviations
- ISO 4: Plainsong Mediev. Music

Indexing
- ISSN: 0961-1371 (print); 1474-0087 (web)
- OCLC no.: 60329104

The PMMS publishes the academic journal Plainsong and Medieval Music (PMM; or Plainsong & Medieval Music) twice a year. It is published by Cambridge University Press, with a scope that covers medieval music, and plainchant from the Middle Ages to the present. Renamed in 1992, it is a continuation of the Journal of the Plainsong & Mediaeval Music Society (1978–1990). The journal consists of new scholarship, book reviews and both an annual bibliography and discography concerning chant-related publications and recordings. Its current editors are Catherine A. Bradley of the University of Cambridge and Daniel J. DiCenso of the College of the Holy Cross.

The more frequently cited articles of the journal include:

- Page, Christopher (1993). "Johannes De Grocheio on Secular Music: a Corrected Text and a New Translation". Plainsong and Medieval Music. 2 (1): 17–41. doi:10.1017/S0961137100000401. S2CID 162777949.
- Bain, Jennifer (2005). "Tonal Structure and the Melodic Role of Chromatic Inflections in the Music of Machaut". Plainsong and Medieval Music. 14 (1): 59–88. doi:10.1017/S0961137104000117. S2CID 162755110.
- Clark, Suzannah (2007). "'S'En Dirai Chançonete': Hearing Text and Music in a Medieval Motet". Plainsong and Medieval Music. 16 (1): 31–59. doi:10.1017/S0961137107000605. S2CID 162937113.
- Curran, Sean (2014). "Reading and Rhythm in the 'La Clayette' Manuscript (Paris, Bibliothèque Nationale De France, Nouv. Acq. Fr. 13521)". Plainsong and Medieval Music. 23 (2): 125–151. doi:10.1017/S0961137114000011. S2CID 163350627.
