= The Canterbury Pilgrims (Dyson) =

The Canterbury Pilgrims is a 1931 oratorio by George Dyson. It is one of the composer's best known large scale works.

== Recording ==
Dyson: Canterbury Pilgrims (At The Tabard Inn) Yvonne Kenny, Robert Tear, Stephen Roberts, London Symphony Chorus, London Symphony Orchestra, Richard Hickox. Chandos: CHAN 241-43 2CD
