= Hesperides (poetry collection) =

1648 collection by Robert Herrick

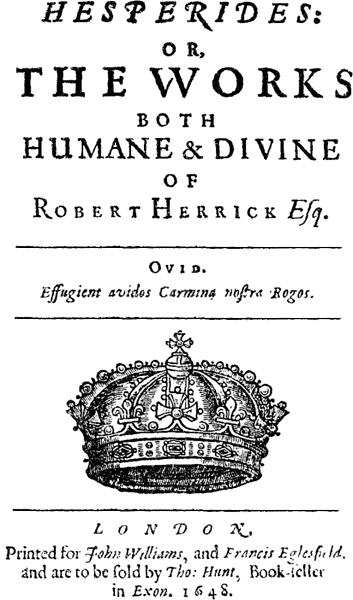
Title page of Robert Herrick's Hesperides, 1648

Hesperides (/hɛˈspɛrɪdiːz/) (complete title, Hesperides; or the Works both Human and Divine of Robert Herrick Esq.) is a book of poetry published in 1648 by English Cavalier poet Robert Herrick. This collection of 1200 lyrical poems, his magnum opus, was published under his direction, and established his reputation. It is replete with carpe diem sentiments. The title refers to the Hesperides, nymphs of the evening in Greek mythology.

== Content ==
Hesperides includes "To the Virgins, to Make Much of Time", which features the famous lines:

Gather ye rosebuds while ye may,
Old time is still a-flying;
And this same flower that smiles today,
To-morrow will be dying.

It also includes "Corinna's Going a-Maying", which includes the lines:

Come, let us goe, while we are in our prime;
And take the harmlesse follie of the time.
We shall grow old apace, and die
Before we know our liberty.
Our life is short; and our dayes run
As fast away as do's the Sunne:
And as a vapour, or a drop of raine
Once lost, can ne'r be found againe.

Furthermore, Hesperides includes “Upon Julia’s Clothes”, which features one of the most famous phrases in English literature:

Whenas in silks my Julia goes,
Then, then (methinks) how sweetly flows
That liquefaction of her clothes.

== Influence ==
The collection gives its name to the literary society of Trinity Hall, Cambridge, where Herrick was a student.
