= Hymnus Paradisi =

Choral work by Herbert Howells

Hymnus Paradisi is a choral work by Herbert Howells for soprano and tenor soloists, mixed chorus, and orchestra. The work was inspired in part by the death from polio of his son Michael in 1935. Howells wrote the work from 1936 to 1938, drawing on material from the then-unpublished Requiem of 1932, but then retained the music privately, without public performance. Howells maintained later in life that Ralph Vaughan Williams convinced him to allow the work to be performed publicly at the Three Choirs Festival. However, his former pupil and biographer Paul Spicer contends that Howells first showed the music to Herbert Sumsion, organist of Gloucester Cathedral, who in turn showed it to Gerald Finzi, and that only after these two expressed their enthusiasm did Howells show the music to Vaughan Williams. The title 'Hymnus Paradisi' was suggested by Sumsion. The work received its successful premiere at the Festival in 1950. The score was published in 1951.

At one time the work was to include a setting of the "Hymnus circa exsequias defuncti" of Prudentius, later set in English as Take him, earth, for cherishing. The opening line, in Latin, instead appears as an epigraph to the published score.

The piece consists of six movements:

1. Preludio (for orchestra)
2. Requiem aeternam
3. The Lord is my shepherd (a setting of Psalm 23)
4. Sanctus. I will lift up mine eyes (which juxtaposes the Sanctus from the Ordinary of the Mass with Psalm 121)
5. I heard a voice from heaven (from the Burial Service)
6. Holy is the true light (from the Salisbury Diurnal, translation by G. H. Palmer)

Hugh Ottaway and Christopher Palmer have commented on the stylistic affinity of Hymnus Paradisi with the music of Frederick Delius.

== Instrumentation ==
- Voices: Soprano and Tenor soloists, SATB Chorus (including a semi-chorus)
- Woodwinds: 2 flutes (2nd doubling piccolo), 2 oboes (2nd doubling cor anglais/English horn), 2 clarinets, 2 bassoons (2nd doubling contrabassoon)
- Brass: 4 horns, 3 trumpets, 3 trombones, 1 tuba
- Percussion/Keyboards: Timpani, percussion (bass drum, cymbals, side drum), harp, celesta/piano, and organ
- Strings: Standard string section (violin I & II, viola, cello, double bass)

== Recordings ==
- EMI CDM 7 63372-2 (CD reissue): Heather Harper, Robert Tear; Bach Choir; King's College Choir; New Philharmonia Orchestra; Sir David Willcocks, conductor
- Hyperion CDA66569: Julie Kennard, John Mark Ainsley; Royal Liverpool Philharmonic Choir; Royal Liverpool Philharmonic Orchestra; Vernon Handley, conductor
- Chandos Chan 9744: Joan Rodgers, Anthony Rolfe Johnson, Alan Opie; BBC Symphony Chorus; BBC Symphony Orchestra; Richard Hickox. 1999

== See also ==
- List of compositions by Herbert Howells
