= Robert Herrick (poet) =

English poet and cleric (1591–1674)

The Reverend Robert Herrick
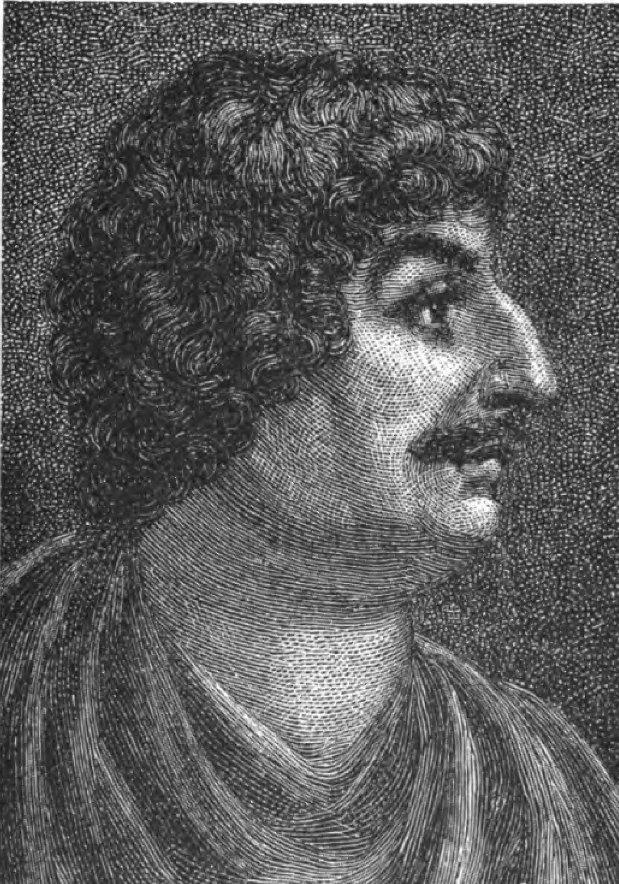
- Herrick, 1904 illustration
- Born: baptised 24 August 1591; London, England
- Died: buried 15 October 1674 (aged 83); Dean Prior, England
- Education: St John's College, Cambridge
- Occupations: Poet and cleric
- Writing career
- Language: Early Modern English
- Notable works: "To the Virgins, to Make Much of Time"; Hesperides

Robert Herrick (baptised 24 August 1591 – buried 15 October 1674) was a 17th-century English lyric poet and Anglican cleric. He is best known for Hesperides, a book of poems. This includes the carpe diem poem "To the Virgins, to Make Much of Time", with the first line "Gather ye rosebuds while ye may".

== Early life ==
Born in Cheapside, London, Robert Herrick was the seventh child and fourth son of Julia Stone and Nicholas Herrick, a prosperous goldsmith. He was named after an uncle, Robert Herrick (or Heyrick), a prosperous Member of Parliament (MP) for Leicester, who had bought the land Greyfriars Abbey stood on after its dissolution by Henry VIII in the mid-16th century. Nicholas Herrick died in a fall from a fourth-floor window in November 1592, when Robert was a year old (whether this was suicide remains unclear).

The tradition that Herrick received his education at Westminster is based on the words "beloved Westminster" in his poem "Tears to Thamesis", but the allusion is to the city, not the school. It is more likely that he, like his uncle's children, attended The Merchant Taylors' School. In 1607 he became apprenticed to his other uncle, Sir William Herrick, a goldsmith and jeweller to the king. The apprenticeship ended after only six years, when Herrick, aged 22, gained admission at St John's College, Cambridge. He later migrated to Trinity Hall, graduating in 1617. Herrick became a member of the Sons of Ben, a group centred on an admiration for the works of Ben Jonson, to whom he wrote at least five poems. Herrick was ordained into the Church of England in 1623 and in 1629 became the vicar of Dean Prior in Devonshire.

== Civil War ==
In 1647, in the wake of the English Civil War, Herrick was ejected from his vicarage for refusing the Solemn League and Covenant. He returned to London to live in Westminster and depend on the charity of his friends and family. He spent some time preparing his lyric poems for publication and had them printed in 1648 under the title Hesperides; or the Works both Human and Divine of Robert Herrick, with a dedication to the Prince of Wales.

== Restoration and later life ==
When Charles II of England was restored to the throne in 1660, Herrick petitioned for his own restoration to his living. He had obtained favour by writing verses celebrating the births of both Charles II and his brother James before the Civil War. Herrick became the vicar of Dean Prior again in the summer of 1662 and lived there until his death in October 1674, at the age of 83. His exact date of death is unknown, but he was buried on 15 October.

Herrick was a bachelor all his life. Many of the women he names in his poems are considered to be fictional characters.

== Poetic style and stature ==
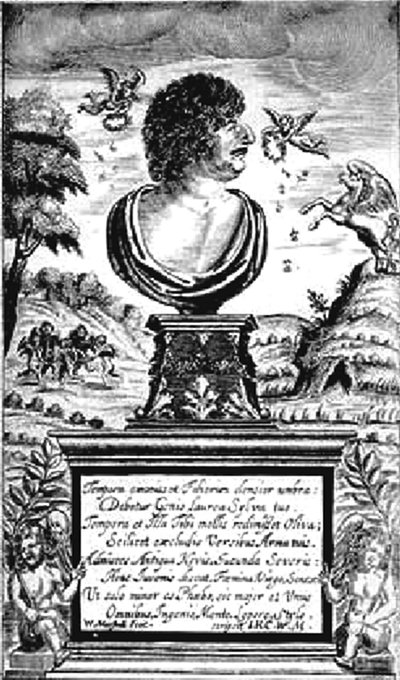
Title page of Hesperides (1648)

Herrick wrote over 2,500 poems, about half of which appear in his major work, Hesperides. Hesperides also includes the much shorter Noble Numbers, his first book of spiritual works, first published in 1648. He is well known for his style, and in his earlier works for frequent references to sex and the female body. His later poetry was of a more spiritual and philosophical nature. Among his most famous short poetical sayings are the unique monometers, such as number 475, "Thus I / Pass by / And die,/ As one / Unknown / And gone."

Herrick sets out his subject-matter in the poem he printed at the beginning of his collection, "The Argument of his Book". He dealt with English country life and its seasons, village customs, complimentary poems to various ladies and his friends, themes taken from classical writings, and a solid bedrock of Christian faith, not intellectualized but underpinning the rest. It has been said of Herrick's style that "his directness of speech with clear and simple presentation of thought, a fine artist working with conscious knowledge of his art, of an England of his youth in which he lives and moves and loves, clearly assigns him to the first place as a lyrical poet in the strict and pure sense of the phrase."

Herrick never married and none of his love poems seems to connect directly with any one woman. He loved the richness of sensuality and the variety of life. This appears vividly in such poems as "Cherry-ripe", "Delight in Disorder" and "Upon Julia's Clothes".

A key message of Herrick's work is that life is short, the world is beautiful and love is a splendid thing, so people should use the short time available to make the most of it. This message is particularly clear in "To the Virgins, to make much of Time", "To Daffodils", "To Blossoms" and "Corinna's Going A Maying", where the tone imply a kind and jovial personality.

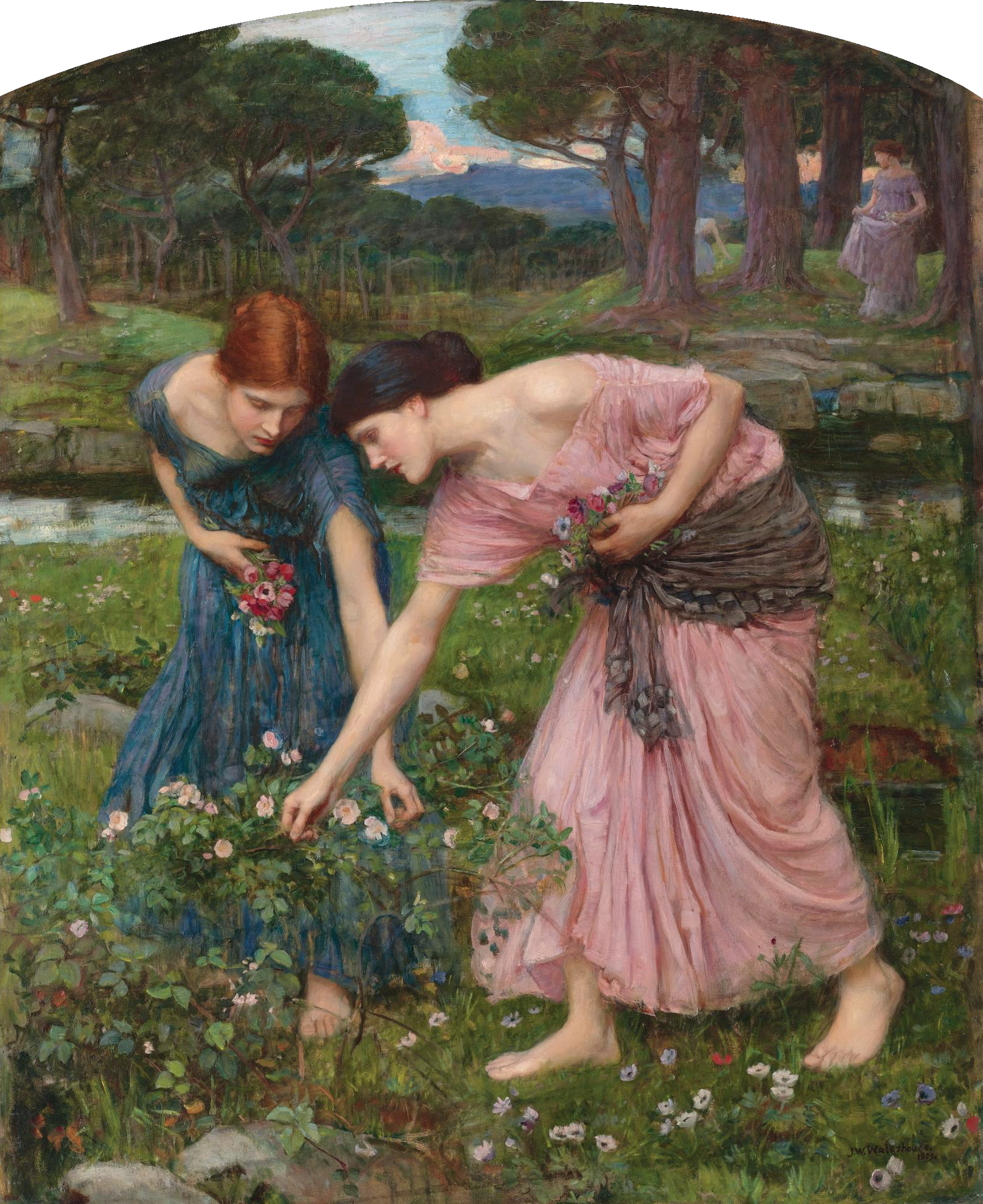
Gather Ye rosebuds While Ye May, by John William Waterhouse, (1909)

The opening stanza in one of his more famous poems, "To the Virgins, to Make Much of Time", runs:

Gather ye rosebuds while ye may,
Old Time is still a-flying;
And this same flower that smiles today,
Tomorrow will be dying.

This is an example of the carpe diem genre, whose popularity Herrick's poems helped to revive.

His poems were none too popular on publication. A style influenced by Ben Jonson, the classical Roman writers and the late Elizabethan era must have seemed old-fashioned to an audience tuned to the complexities of metaphysical poets such as John Donne and Andrew Marvell. His work was rediscovered in the early 19th century and has been regularly printed since.

The Victorian poet Swinburne described Herrick as "the greatest song writer ever born of English race". Despite his use of classical allusions and names, Herrick's poems are easier for modern readers than those of many of his contemporaries.

== In literature ==
Herrick appears in James Branch Cabell's "Concerning Corrina", published in his 1916 short-story volume The Certain Hour: Dizain des Poëtes. The story strongly suggests that the poet was an adept of the dark arts. Though technically a mystery or horror story, it is best classed as a philosophical comedy.

Herrick is a major character in Rose Macaulay's 1932 historical novel They Were Defeated.

Samuel Beckett's play Happy Days has the character Winnie quote from Herrick's "To the Virgins to Make Much of Time".

Ken Bruen in his debut novel Rilke on Black makes Herrick's two-line poem "Dreams" a favorite with the protagonist Nick. Robert Herrick is one of many historical characters in the alternate history series 1632. The dedication in Thomas Burnett Swann's Will-o-the-Wisp (1976, ISBN 9780552103589) is "A novel suggested by the life of Robert Herrick, poet, vicar, and pagan".

== In music ==
The first composers to set Herrick to music were near-contemporaries: at least 40 settings of 31 poems appear in the extant manuscript and printed songbooks of 1624–1683, by Henry and William Lawes, John Wilson, Robert Ramsey and others. It is clear from references within Hesperides that many other settings have not survived.

From the early 20th century, Herrick's verse became popular with a range of composers. One of them, Fritz Hart, was by far the most prolific, with more than 120 settings composed throughout his life, mostly collected in Fourteen Songs, op. 10 (1912), Twenty-One Songs, op. 23 (1916), Twenty Five Songs in five sets, opp. 50–54 (1922), Nine Sets of Four Songs Each, opp. 82–90 (1930), Three Sets of Five Songs, opp. 148–150 (1941), and Two Sets of Five Songs, opp. 166–167 (1948).

Other settings from this period include:

- Arnold Bax: To Daffodils; Eternity
- Lennox Berkeley: How love came in
- Havergal Brian: The Mad Maid's Song; Why dost thou wound, and break my heart?; The Night Piece
- Frank Bridge: The Primrose; The Hag; Fair Daffodils
- Benjamin Britten: Spring Symphony (To Violets); Five Flower Songs (To Daffodils; The Succession of the Four Sweet Months)
- Isaiah Burnell: Gather Ye Rosebuds, choral setting (1930)
- Benjamin Burrows: Upon Love; The Olive Branch; The Wounded Cupid; To Music
- Geoffrey Bush: Four Songs from Herrick's Hesperides (1949) (The Impatient Lover; Upon the Loss of his Mistresses; To Electra; Upon Julia's Clothes)
- Samuel Coleridge-Taylor: The Guest (Scena)
- Jean Coulthard: Threnody (Here a solemn fast we keep), choral setting (1935)
- Walford Davies: Eternity; Noble Numbers, op. 28 (Weigh me the fire; God's Dwelling; Grace for a Child; What Sweeter Music)
- Frederick Delius: To Daffodils
- George Dyson: To Music
- Christopher Edmunds: The Bellman
- John Foulds: To Music
- John Gardner: Herrick Cantata, 1961 (To music, a song; To daisies, not to shut too soon; A dialogue betwixt himself and Mistress Eliza Wheeler; Cherry ripe; Love: what it is; To love; Corinna's gone a-Maying; To music, to becalm his fever; On himself; To Anthea, who may command him anything)
- Ivor Gurney: To Violets; Lullaby
- Pamela Harrison: The Kindling of the Day, song cycle (To Julia, in her Dawn, or Daybreak; Upon Julia’s Haire, Filled With Dew; The Tear Sent to Her from Staines; To the Western Wind; A Meditation for His Mistress; To Musick, a Song; To the Water Nymphs Drinking at the Fountain; Gilly-flowers; To Daisies, Not to Shut So Soon; The Night-Piece: To Julia.
- Muriel Herbert: I dare not ask a kiss; To Daffodils)
- Joseph Holbrooke: To Dianeme
- Herbert Howells: Here she lies, a pretty bud
- Peter Hurford: Litany to the Holy Spirit
- Kenneth V. Jones: Hesperides, song cycle
- Ernest John Moeran: Candlemas Eve
- R.O. Morris: Corinna's Maying, SATB, 1933)
- Hubert Parry: Julia
- Roger Quilter: To Julia, song cycle (1996), op. 8: (The Bracelet; The Maiden Blush; To Daisies; The Night Piece; Julia's Hair; Cherry Ripe). To Electra; Tulips
- Dagmar de Corval Rybner: Bid Me to LIve
- Alan Rawsthorne: To Daffodils
- Hugh S. Roberton: Here a solemn fast we keep (threnody for equal voices, 1929)
- Charles Villiers Stanford: To Carnations; To the Rose; A Welcome Song; To Music
- Robert Still: To Julia; Upon Julia's Clothes; The Poetry of Dress
- Donald Tovey: The Mad Maid's Song (in three parts)
- Ralph Vaughan Williams: To Daffodils (two settings)
- Peter Warlock: Two Short Songs (I held love's head; Thou gav'st me leave to kiss)
- Charles Wood: The Ride of the Witch (setting of The Hag); To Music (both 1913)
- Leslie Woodgate: The White Island

Robert Herrick's poetry remains popular in musical arrangements, with modern choral adaptations produced by James Curnow and Will Todd.

== See also ==
- Country house poems
