= Gather Ye Rosebuds While Ye May (Waterhouse painting 1909) =

Painting by John William Waterhouse

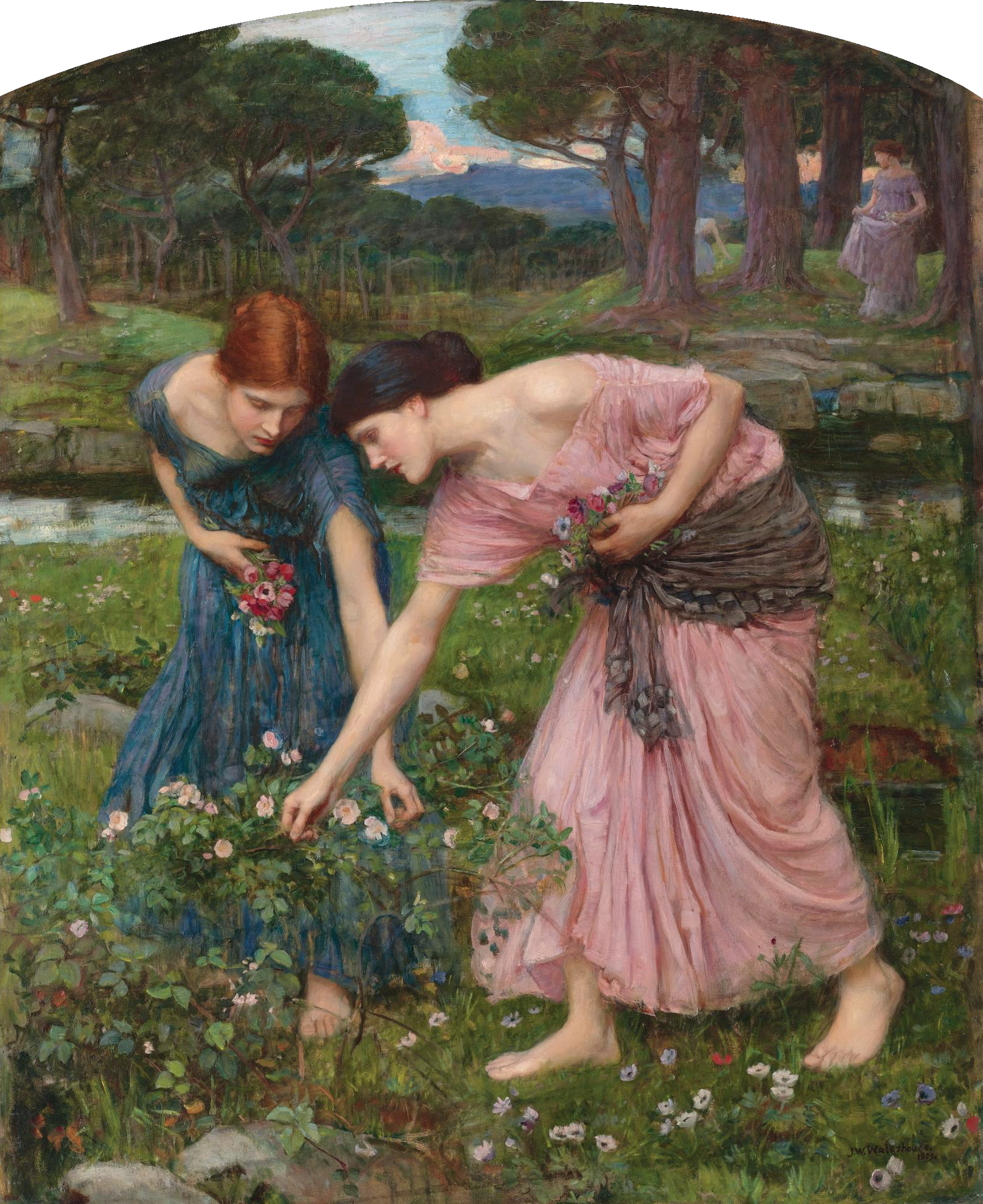
- Artist: John William Waterhouse
- Year: 1909
- Medium: Oil on canvas
- Dimensions: 100 cm × 83 cm (39.5 in × 32.5 in)
- Location: Fairlight Art, UK

Gather Ye Rosebuds While Ye May is an oil painting on canvas created in 1909 by British Pre-Raphaelite artist John William Waterhouse. It was the second of two paintings inspired by the 17th century poem "To the Virgins, to Make Much of Time" by Robert Herrick which begins:

Gather ye rosebuds while ye may,
Old Time is still a-flying;
And this same flower that smiles today,
Tomorrow will be dying.

Lost for nearly a century, this painting was later located in an old Canadian farmhouse. In 1973, a couple was buying the farmhouse and asked its previous owners to keep the painting, which they admired, within the house. Although the new owners knew it was a Waterhouse artwork, they had no idea of its worth or even that it was missing. In 2002, when they took it to an art dealer to be appraised, he "nearly fell off his chair." Nobody knows how the painting ended up in the house, although it is known to have been in Canada since 1959.

The artwork was valued at $1.75–2.5 million by Sotheby's prior to auction in April 2007, although the painting went unsold.

== See also ==
- Gather Ye Rosebuds While Ye May (Waterhouse painting 1908)
- List of paintings by John William Waterhouse
