= Anselm Hughes =

English musicologist (1889–1974)

- Born: Humphrey Vaughan Anselm Hughes; 15 April 1889; London, England, UK
- Died: 8 September 1974 (aged 85); Nashdom Abbey, England, UK
- Known for: Scholarship on Early music

Academic background
- Education: Keble College, Oxford; Ely Theological College

Academic work
- Discipline: Early music
- Institutions: Plainsong and Mediaeval Music Society; Nashdom Abbey

Humphrey Vaughan Anselm Hughes (15 April 1889 – 8 September 1974), also known as Dom Anselm Hughes, was an English musicologist who specialized in early music. From the 1920s onwards, he was an Anglican Benedictine monk at the Pershore Abbey and later Nashdom Abbey. He was long associated with the Plainsong and Mediaeval Music Society and contributed to both the Oxford History of Music and New Oxford History of Music.
