= Nashdom =

Building in Buckinghamshire, England

Coordinates: 51°33′00″N 0°40′29″W

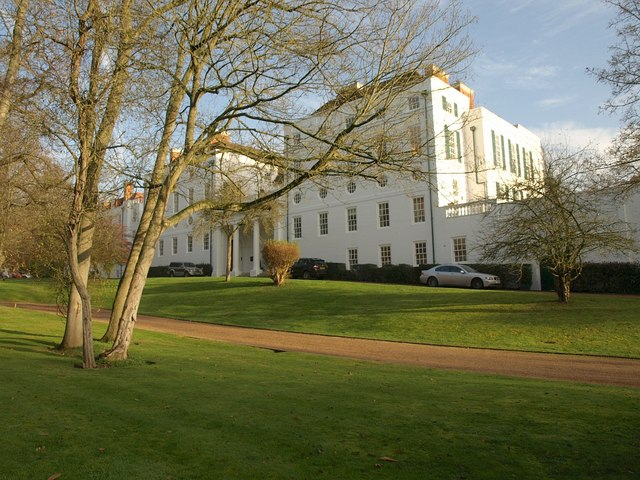
Northwest, entrance front

Nashdom, also known as Nashdom Abbey, is a former country house and former Anglican Benedictine abbey in Burnham, Buckinghamshire, England. Designed in Neo-Georgian style by architect Edwin Lutyens, it is a Grade II* listed building. It was converted into apartments in 1997. The gardens are Grade II listed in the National Register of Historic Parks and Gardens.

== Country house ==
=== Owners ===
The name Nashdom is romanised Russian (Russian: Наш дом, IPA: [naʂ dom]), meaning "our home". Lutyens' clients were Prince and Princess Dolgorouki. Prince Alexis, a son of Prince Serge Dolgorouki, was formerly the chamberlain in the Russian court. In 1898 he married Frances, the only daughter and heiress of the Scottish shipping magnate Fleetwood Pellew Wilson, of Wappenham Manor, Northamptonshire. The couple's British residences included Braemar Castle, Aberdeenshire, and a house in Upper Grosvenor Street, London.

The Princess wanted an additional residence, for royal guests and house parties. Lutyens visited the site in July 1905, thinking it beautiful but a very difficult one for the Princess's ideal house, which he thought would cost £20,000. Her initial budget was only £6,000, and they finally agreed on a design costing £15,000. Sources differ on the house's completion date, ranging from 1908, to 1911.

The Prince died, aged 68, in June 1915. Thereafter, the Princess lived in Pyrénées-Atlantiques, France, where she died in August 1919, aged 69. In her will, she left Nashdom for the use of the Dolgorouki family, under the stewardship of Serge Alexandrovitch Dolgorouki, aided by her executor, Herbert Brisbane Ewart.

=== Architecture ===
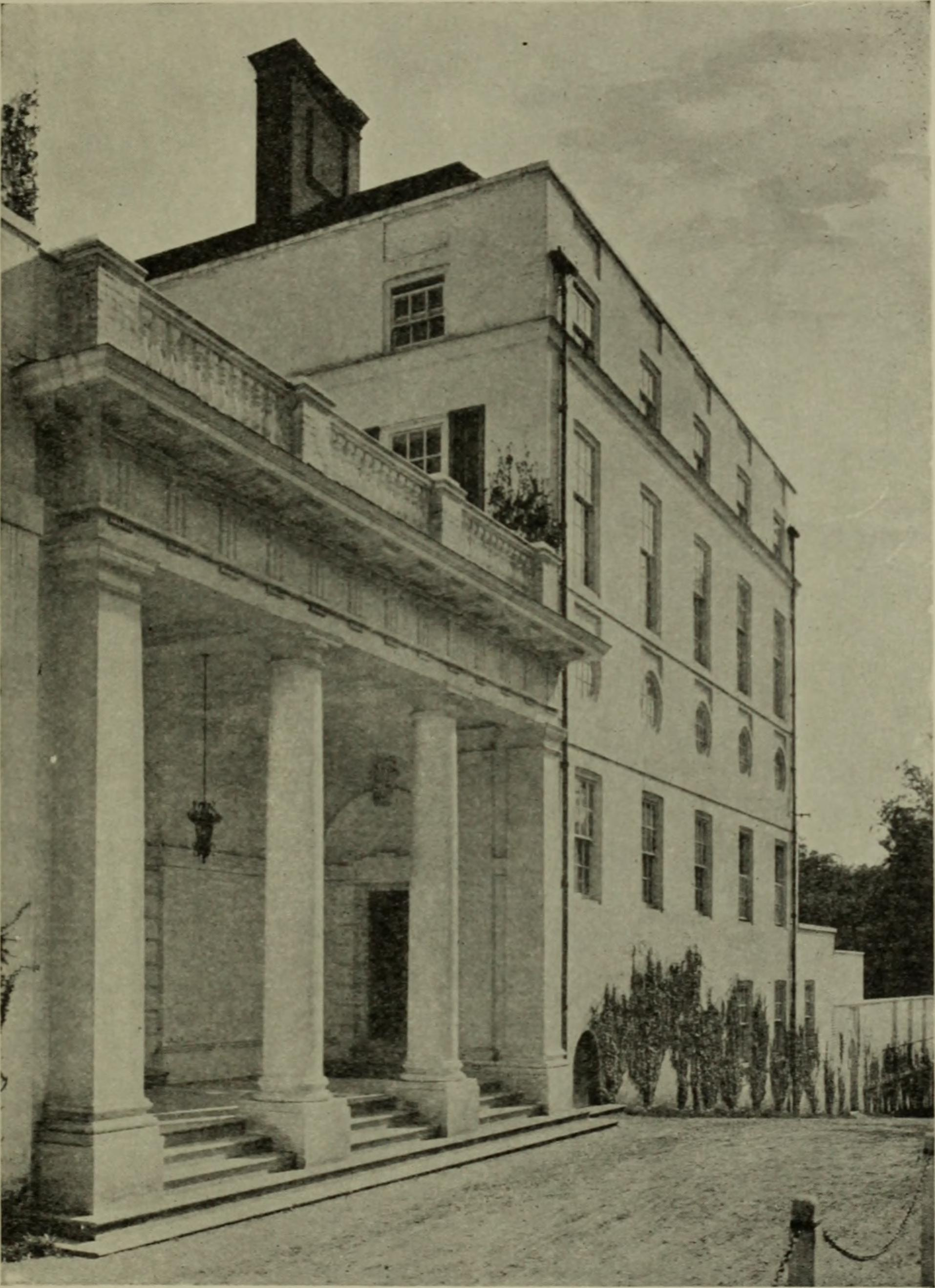
Entrance, 1921

Lutyens built the house in Neo-Georgian style, using whitewashed brick. It is one of his earliest completely neoclassical buildings. To accommodate the steeply sloping site, he built a basement level under the southwest half of the house.

The northwest, entrance front had an urban appearance, built tight against the road. Massive and austerely neoclassical, it had at its centre a Doric colonnade giving into the entrance porch, directly beyond which was, not the main entrance door, but access via a wrought iron gate into a semicircular courtyard. Instead, the main door was inside the porch on the left, giving access to the entrance hall. A door in the porch on the right gave access to the service quarters.

The entrance hall contained two staircases. The main one, straight ahead from the door and 12 feet (3.7 m) wide, led up to the Big Room, the main room for entertaining. A second staircase, at right angles to the first and 8 feet (2.4 m) wide, led towards the suite of rooms on the garden front, via a grand landing. The landing had a wind dial on the wall, showing the wind direction superimposed on a local map. It was connected to a weathervane on the roof.

Southeast, garden front

The southeast, garden front was much less severe than the entrance front, and has been called one of the most unusual facades of any Georgian house. Lutyens made extensive use of green-shuttered sash windows, spaced exceptionally close together. Along the garden front, starting from the eastern end, were a loggia, the Big Room, a circular drawing room fronted by a broad bow window, a glass-domed hall known as the Winter Garden, a dining room fronted by another bow window, and a smoking room. The bow windows continued up the facade, and the circular drawing room was surmounted by a circular bedroom. There was a semicircular dip in the centre of the facade, probably in order to let light into the glass dome.

== Abbey ==
=== Origins ===
The Anglican Benedictine community of Caldey Abbey, Pembrokeshire, converted to Roman Catholicism in 1913, with the exception of a small Anglican remnant, which moved into Abbey House at Pershore Abbey, Worcestershire. The new community was formally established in May 1914, though it had only one professed monk and two oblates. In 1915 the monk, Anselm Mardon, converted to Rome and went back to Caldey. Denys Prideaux, one of the oblates, was appointed warden, and in 1922 became the first abbot. The community soon found itself in need of more space. The Dolgoroukis' agent, Ewart, was a friend of the community, and alerted it to Nashdom's availability. The community bought Nashdom in May 1924 for £8,000, and moved there in September 1926.

=== Life ===
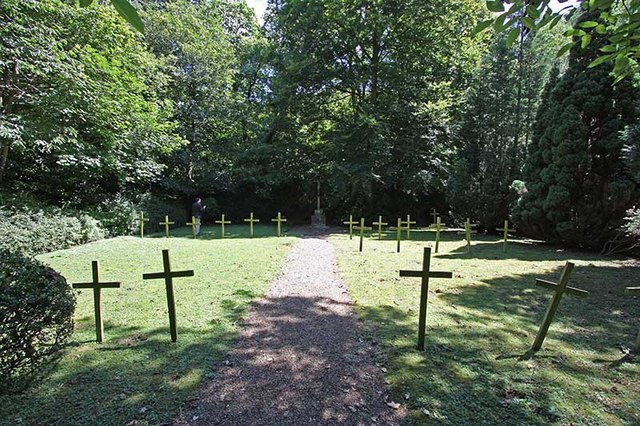
Abbey cemetery

Nashdom Abbey was a centre of Anglican Papalism, and used the Roman Rite. Its leading exponent in this was the liturgical scholar Gregory Dix. He joined the community in 1926, just before the move from Pershore, and in 1948 became prior. He died in 1952 and was buried in the abbey cemetery.

The composer and musicologist Anselm Hughes was Nashdom's director of music, 1922–45, and prior, 1936–45. He died at Nashdom in 1974. Another member of the community, Bernard Clements, became a broadcaster and the vicar of All Saints, Margaret Street, London.

=== Daughter priory ===
In 1935, Nashdom started the training of a group of American Episcopalians led by Paul Severance. In 1939, they founded St Gregory's House, later known as St Gregory's Priory, in Valparaiso, Indiana. In 1946 the priory moved to Three Rivers, Michigan. It remained a dependency of Nashdom until 1969, when it became St Gregory's Abbey.

=== Relocation ===
In 1987, the shrinking community left Nashdom for Elmore Abbey, near Newbury, Berkshire, where they built an abbey church, completed in 1995. Justin Welby, who later became the Archbishop of Canterbury, was a regular visitor to the abbey from the early 1990s, and became an Anglican Benedictine oblate in 2004.

In September 2010 the remaining four monks moved again, into the Principal's House of Sarum College, in the close of Salisbury Cathedral, Wiltshire. In June 2011, they gained planning permission to build an extension to the house, including an oratory.

== Apartment complex ==
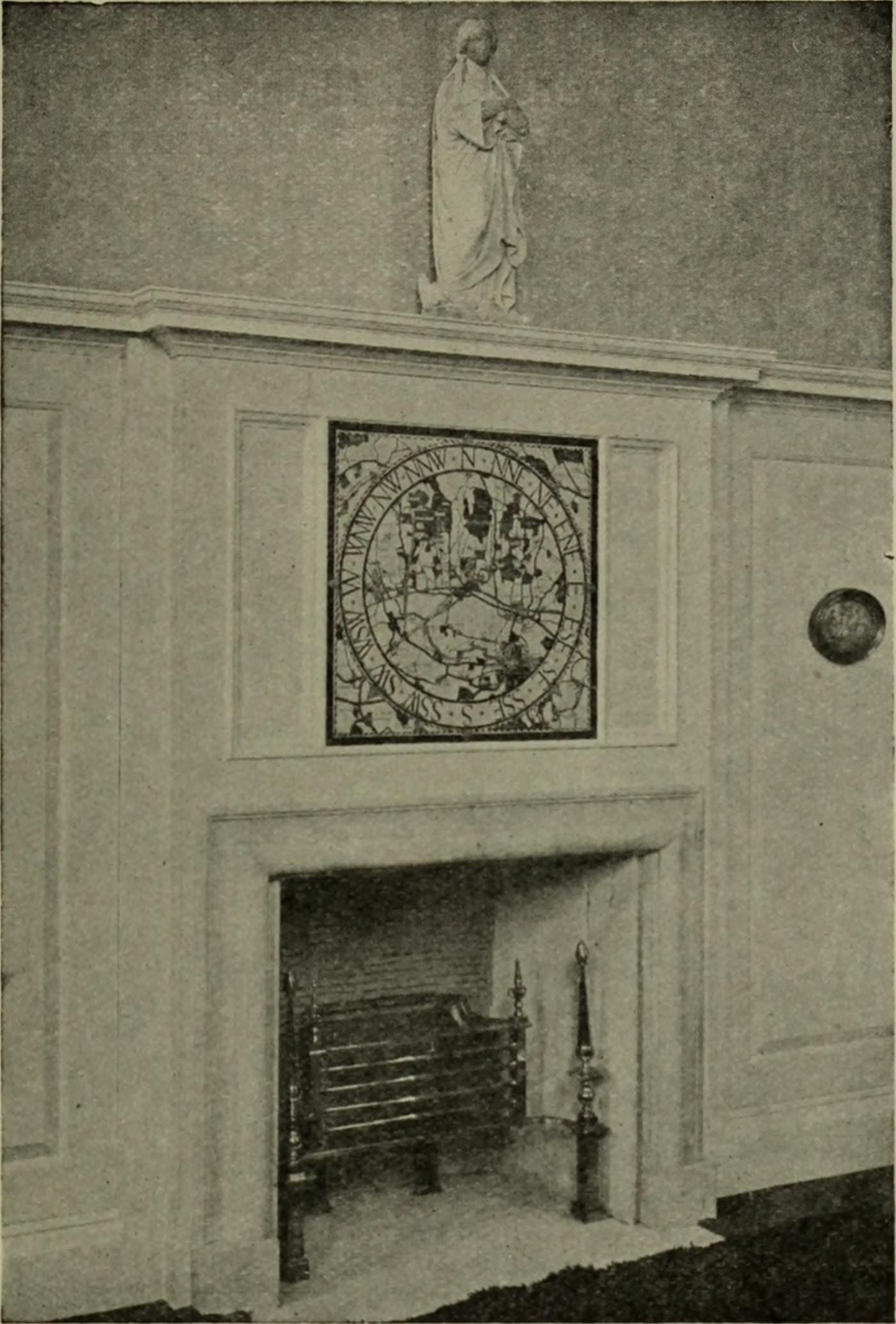
The wind dial in 1921

Nashdom and its outbuildings were converted into an apartment complex in 1997. The house was turned into 15 apartments. Although the interior was much changed, the wind dial on the landing was kept, together with a bust of Princess Dolgorouki. The complex includes a swimming pool, tennis court and gym.

== Gardens ==
There are 4 hectares (9.9 acres) of grounds, forming a long, south-pointing triangle, with the house at the northern end. The southeast, garden front of the house overlooks the main lawn. A massive retaining wall, 20 feet (6.1 m) high, topped by a balustrade, runs along the southwest edge of this lawn, with a great stone stairway descending in two flights to the former west lawn, now a car park. From the top of the stairway, a straight path (originally stone terracing) runs southeast, along the top of the retaining wall, and another runs northeast along the house's garden front, leading to a circular, walled rose garden.

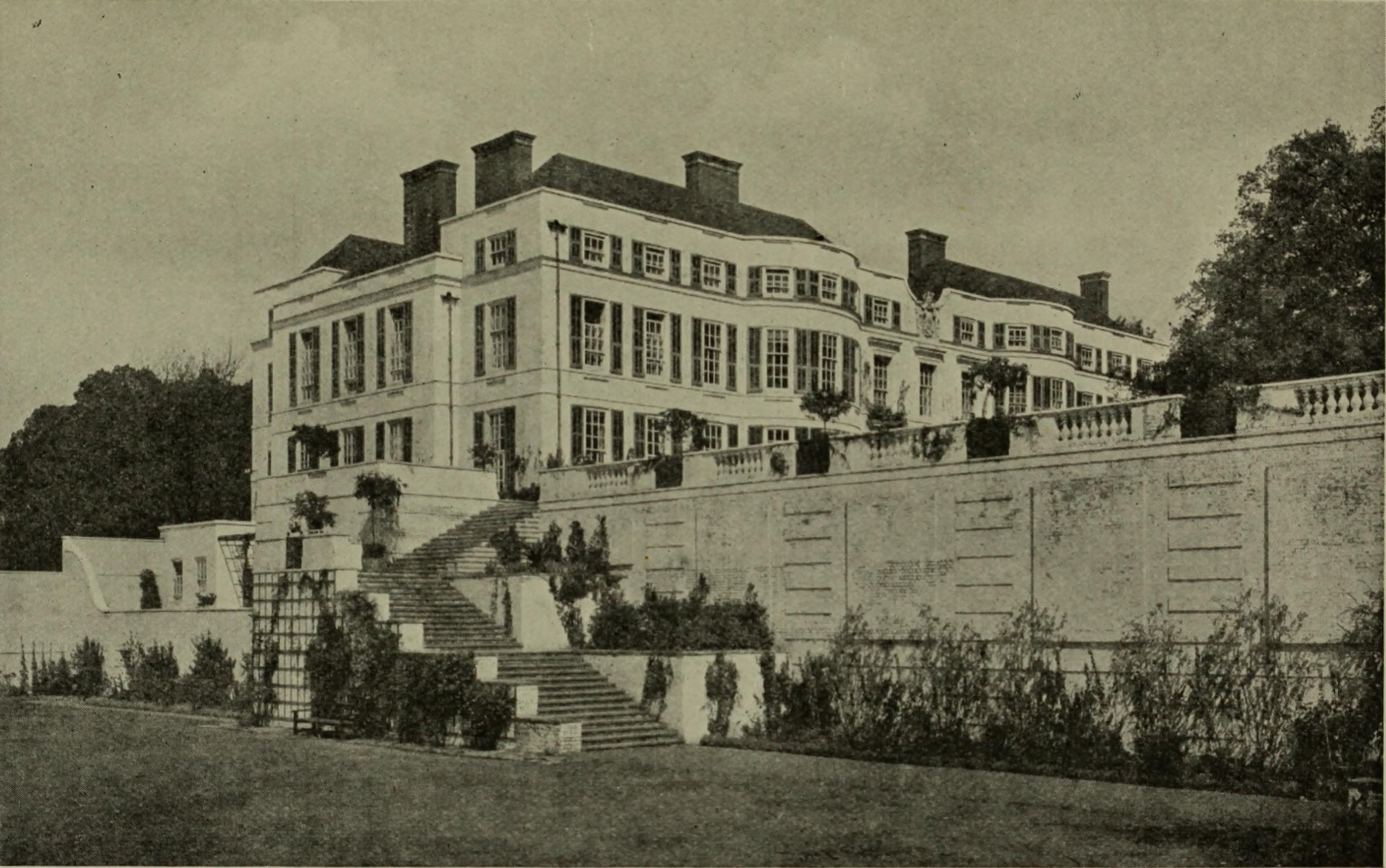
View from south, 1921, showing the retaining wall and stairway

From the main lawn, a central path, originally an avenue lined with chestnuts, leads southwards into mixed woodland, underplanted with rhododendrons. The small abbey cemetery is among the trees.

A number of Lutyens-designed features are Grade II listed buildings, including the rose garden wall, a stable, a gatehouse, and an alcove at the northern end of the former chestnut avenue.
