= Poussay Gospels =

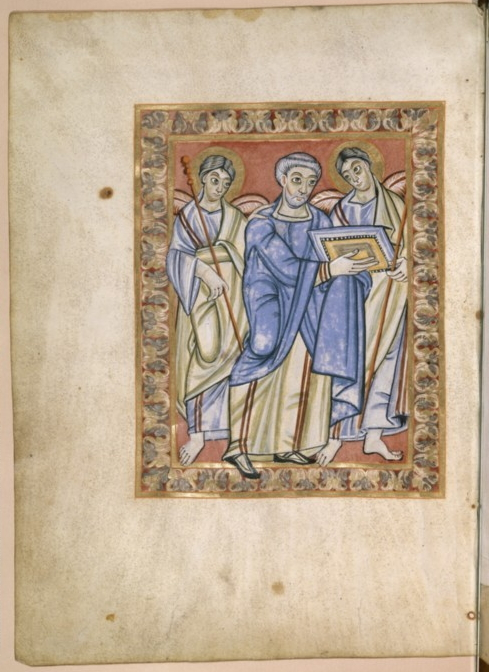
First full-page miniature, showing Berthold (folio 3, verso).

The Poussay Gospels is a 233-folio illuminated Gospel Book, produced around 980 in the scriptorium of Reichenau Abbey in southern Germany. It was given to a Benedictine convent in Poussay by its founder Berthold of Toul, who had been named bishop by Otto III, Holy Roman Emperor. Between 1025 and 1050 pope Leo IX gave the abbey a new binding for the work, including a Byzantine ivory plaque. After that abbey closed the manuscript entered the town library in Mirecourt, which in 1844 sold it to the Bibliothèque nationale de France for 3,000 francs 50 centimes in notes. It is still in the BNF, as Latin 10514. It was one of ten Ottonian manuscripts registered by UNESCO on the Memory of the World Register in 2003.

== Sources ==
- http://archivesetmanuscrits.bnf.fr/ead.html?id=FRBNFEAD000072232
