= G. H. Palmer =

English Anglo-Catholic priest, musicologist and organist

George Herbert Palmer (Grantchester, 9 August 1846 – Oxford, 20 June 1926) was an English Anglo-Catholic priest, musicologist, organist, and expert on plainchant, particularly of the Sarum Use. Named after the priest and poet George Herbert, he was ordained a priest in Chester in 1871 and later was organist of St Margaret's Church in Toxteth Park, Liverpool, and St Barnabas, Pimlico, London. He helped found the Plainsong and Medieval Music Society (PMMS) in 1888. The majority of his extensive editions of liturgical music and texts were produced by the PMMS and the Community of St Mary the Virgin at Wantage in Oxfordshire. He was notable and influential for his musically sensitive translations of Latin hymns into English.

== Works ==
- The Antiphoner and Grail: Being the Words of the Antiphons and Hymns at Mattins and Evening, and also of the Introits, Graduals, and Sequences at the Holy Eucharist, Derived Mainly from the Sarum Breviary and Missal, and Adapted to the Use of the Book of Common Prayer (1880)
- The Hymner, Containing Translations of Hymns from the Sarum and Other English Service-books, Supplemented by Sequences from Various Sources (1891)
- The Office Hymn-Book, Part II: Harmonies for Organists (1891)
- The Sarum Psalter, 1894
- The Introduction and Tone-Table to the Sarum Psalter (1898)
- The Psalms of David, Pointed to the Eight Gregorian Tones as Given in the Sarum Tonale (1898)
- The Order of Compline from the Sarum Breviary (1899)
- The Order of Vespers from the Sarum Breviary (1899)
- The Responds at Vespers throughout the Year, with the Musical Notation, from the Salisbury Antiphoner (1899–1902)
  - Proper of the Season, Advent
  - Christmas to Lent
  - Lent and Passion-tide
  - Common of Saints
- The Order of Compline Throughout the Year: With the Musical Notation from the Salisbury Antiphoner (1899)
- The Antiphons to Magnificat Throughout the Year: From the Sarum Breviary (1900)
- A Selection of Offices, Grails and Alleluyas for Sundays and Festivals from the Sarum Gradale (1900)
  - volume one
- Additional Settings of Certain of the Canticles at Mattins and Evensong adapted from Sarum Service-books (1902)
- Requiem Services, Containing the Music of Vespers and Mass, Together with the Order for the Burial of the Dead (1902–1903)
  - The Order for 'Placebo' or Vespers of the Dead, with the Musical Notation from the Salisbury Antiphoner
  - The Musick of the Mass for the Dead Adapted to the English Text from the Sarum Manuale
  - The Order for the Burial of the Dead Adapted to Plain-Chant from the Sarum Antiphoner (1903)
- The Hymner: Containing Translations of the Hymns from the Sarum Breviary Together with Sundry Sequences and Processions (1905)
- The Great Advent Antiphons: With the Musical Notation from the Salisbury Antiphoner (1910)
- Salve festa dies: A Hymn for Easter Day, with Words and Musick Drawn from the Sarum Processionale (1912)
- The Psalms and Canticles at Mattins and Evensong Pointed to the Eight Gregorian Tones from the Sarum Tonale (1920)
- The Diurnal After the Use of the Illustrious Church of Salisbury (1921–1930)
- The Diurnal Noted: From the Salisbury Use, translated into English and Adapted to the Original Music-note (1926)
- The Offices, or Introits for Sundays and festivals : with the musical notation from the Sarum Gradale (1927)
- The Order of Tenebrae, Or Mattins and Lauds, of the Last Three Days of Holy Week, from the Salisbury Antiphoner (1929)
  - corrected edition (1956)
- The Order for Placebo, or Vespers of the Dead from the Diurnal Noted (1947)
- The Antiphons upon Benedictus from the Salisbury Antiphoner (1958)
