= To the Virgins, to Make Much of Time =

1648 poem by Robert Herrick

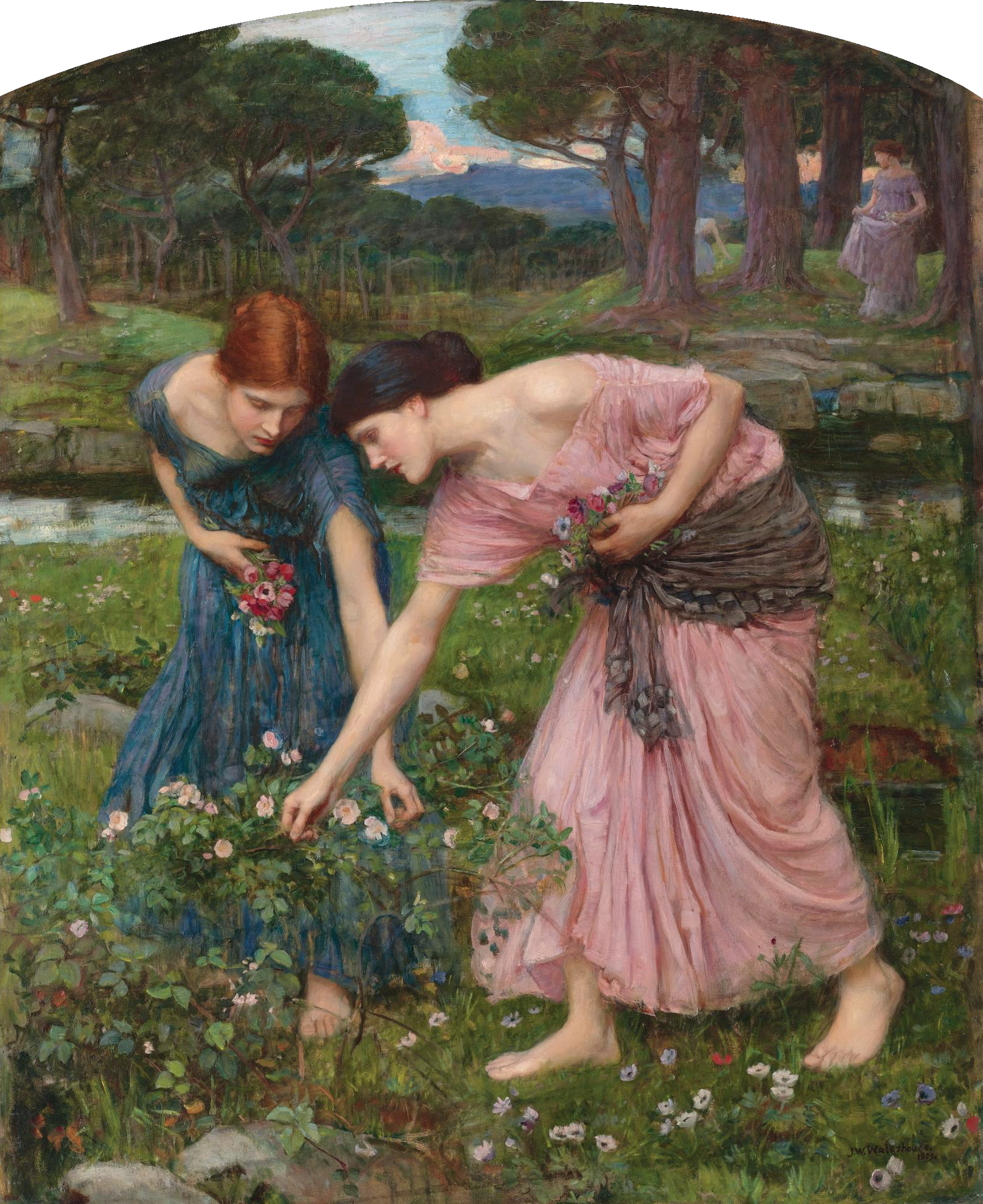
Gather Ye Rosebuds While Ye May, by John William Waterhouse

"To the Virgins, to Make Much of Time" is a 1648 poem by the English Cavalier poet Robert Herrick. The poem was first published as number 208 in the verse collection Hesperides. It is directed to young women, urging them, since time is fleeting, to find love and joy in life while they are still young. Benjamin Brawley described it as having a "wistfulness" which "endeared [Herrick] to all later lovers of the beautiful." The first line, "Gather ye Rose-buds while ye may," has been described as amongst the most famous opening lines in English poetry.

== 1648 text ==
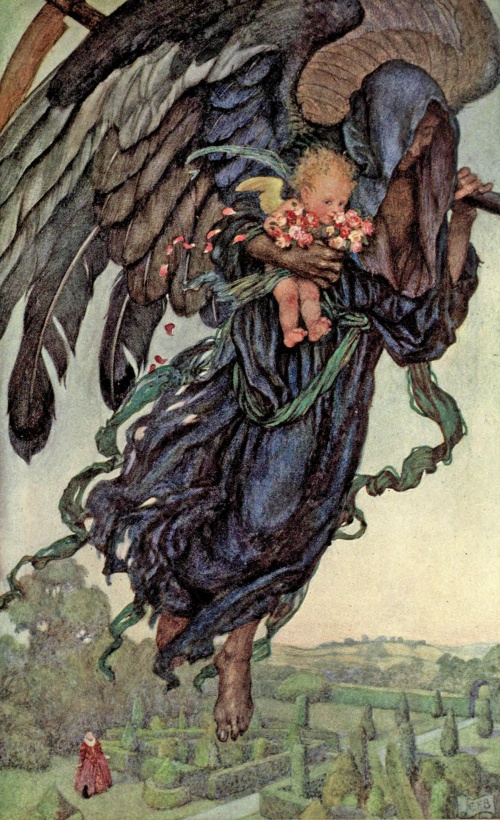
Illustration by Eleanor Fortescue-Brickdale

Gather ye Rose-buds while ye may,
Old Time is still a-flying:
And this same flower that smiles to day,
To morrow will be dying.

The glorious Lamp of Heaven, the Sun,
The higher he's a getting;
The sooner will his Race be run,
And neerer he's to Setting.

That Age is best, which is the first,
When Youth and Blood are warmer;
But being spent, the worse, and worst
Times, still succeed the former.

Then be not coy, but use your time;
And while ye may, go marry:
For having lost but once your prime,
You may forever tarry.

== See also ==
- 1648 in poetry
- Catullus 5
- Lady Du Qiu
- Gondola no Uta
- To His Coy Mistress
