= Dhampir =

Half vampire, half human creature

In Balkan folklore, a dhampir (Albanian pronunciation: [ðamˈpir]) is a mythical creature said to be the hybrid offspring resulting from a union between a vampire and a human.

== Names and definitions ==
This union was usually between a male "vampire" and a female human, while stories of female vampires mating with male humans are rare. (Note: Note that only males became vampires, according to the beliefs of Podrima (Podrimlje in Kosovo). Podrima or Anadrini is the Albanian name for the region; its economic center is Prizren.)

In the present context, the Slavonic "vampire" (Serbo-Croatian, Bulgarian, Macedonian, Russian: vampir вампир) (Note: Older Serbo-Croat form upir.) denotes the "spirit of the dead", more or less, to be distinguished from the popularized blood-drinking "vampire". (Note: The traditional Slavonic "vampire" did require the stereotypical "stake driven through its corpse" (or else a beheading) to destroy it, and the goriness of this business may have later led to the close linking with blood.) (Note: Though the subsequent vampire is not said to keep drinking blood to sustain itself, there is indeed a Balkan lore which maintains that when an evil spirit enters a dead body, it could rise up and strangle people and cattle to drink the blood, thence turning into a vampire. This is given by T. P. Vukanović in his "Vampire" survey, immediately after giving a list of (Serbo-Croatian) terms for vampire such as ljugat.)

Much Slavonic vampire terminology and beliefs (including the lore concerning the offspring) is considered to have been disseminated in the Balkans and other areas by Romani migration. Serbian ethnologist Tatomir P. Vukanović surveyed such vampir lore amongst especially the Romani of certain targeted areas within Serbia (Post WWII Autonomous Province of Kosovo and Metohija, and prewar Stari Ras and Novo-Pazarski Sandžak which adjoins it to the north). (Note: Most material on dhampirs is in Vukanović (1959), part 4, vol. 38 under the heading "Dhampir as the Chief Magician for the Destruction of Vampires". Reprinted Perkowski (1976), pp. 305–309 "Section 15. Dhawpir [sic] as the Chief Magician for the Destruction of Vampires", and Perkowski (2006), pp. 251ff)

The revived vampir develops the desire to engage in sexual intercourse with his wife (widow), etc., (Cf. § Folklore for more particulars on its sexual activity). The resulting child from such conjugal visit was called the dhampir, but this was an Albanian language term (Note: Cf. § Etymology.) used among Muslims, (Note: The present Kosovo is largely ethnically Albanian and religiously Muslim, as is well-known.) and the appellation differed depending on the region or religious demographics:

The half-vampire offspring was called dhampir if a boy, and dhampiresa if a girl among the Muslim Roma of these Serbian provinces. Orthodox Christian Romani also distinguished the crossbred child as vampir if a boy, and vampiresa if a girl,

Names denoting "vampir's son" were also recorded, i.e., vampijerović (in Serbian) among Romani of the Novo-Pazarski Sandžak; vampirić ('little vampire') in Kosovo-Metohija; and also lampijerović in the dialects of Stari Ras and the Sandžak. (Note: Note that lampir, lampijer are Serbo-Croat dialect forms of vampir.) (cf. § Variants below)

The Dampyr is also styled Dhampyre. Popular culture refer to vampire offspring variously as Daywalker, Twilight children, or Vampire hybrid.

=== Etymology ===
The word dhampir is an Albanian word which in turn is borrowed from South Slavic vampir. (Note: Palmér et al. (2021): "As the substitution dh- for v- is unparalleled in Romance borrowings, we must be dealing with a dissimilation *v–p > *ð–p. Indeed, additional support for such a development can be found in the borrowing of the South Slavic word for 'vampire', Bulg. vampir, SCr. vàmpīr, as Alb. dhampir (see Topalli 2003 for a discussion). ... Given that dhespër 'evening' and dhampir 'vampire' are both loans, one may wonder whether dhelpë could also be a loan".) (Note: According to librarian Geoff Husić, it could also have been encouraged by a folk etymology, connecting it with the Gheg Albanian words dhamb 'tooth' and pir 'to drink'.) The shift v > dh is a feature of Albanian. (Note: Dhampiraj is also an Albanian surname.)

=== Variants ===
Mythical creatures like dhampirs are widely associated with Balkan folklore. In the rest of the region, terms such as Serbian vampirović (вампировић), vampirdžija (вампирџија), vampirče (вампирче), vampirić; and in Bosnian the aforementioned dialect form lampijerović is used, all literally meaning "vampire's son".

In Bulgarian folklore, terms such as glog (глог lit. 'hawthorn'; plural: глогове), vampirdzhiya/vampiradzhiya (Вампирджия/вампираджия "vampire" + nomen agentis suffix; plural vampir[a]dzhii вампирджии), vampirar (вампирар "vampire" + nomen agentis suffix) are applied to people sired by the vampir. These are considered the only ones capable of spotting and slaying the vampir, other than the sŭbotnik (съботник, pl. sŭbotnitsi съ́ботници), the Saturday-born, or the hodja (Muslim schoolmaster).

Other Bulgarian names for these are dzhadadzhiya (джададжия, plural: dzhadadzhii джададжии) and svetocher (светочер, plural: svetocheri светочери). (Note: Female vampires are also called vampirica.)

== Folklore ==
It has been generally held by both Orthodox and Muslim Romani in Kosovo and adjoining Serbian provinces that the vampire after revivification (Note: In Podrima, he is thought to immediately rise from the grave and visit the wife; however the belief is widespread across the Orthodox and Muslim Gypsies of Kosovo-Metohija that the "vampire appears about six weeks after death".) is aroused into having sexual intercourse with his wife or some suitable young woman. Not only in Serbia, but in the Balkans in general (the territories of the South Slavs) the vampir was said to return in order to engage in sex with his wife; in Bulgaria the vampir was feared for deflowering virgins. In one case, a Serbian widow tried to blame her pregnancy on her late husband, who had supposedly become a vampire, and there were cases of Serbian men pretending to be vampires to reach the women they desired. (Note: Vukanović reveals his own uncle to have been once guilty of professing to be a vampire to engage in trysts with young women.) Similar motif also occurs in Belarusian legends.

It is assumed that dhampirs were for the most part, normal members of the community. The first generation of dhampir, born between a woman and a vampir, is usually a male child. (Note: Cf. the belief in the village of Voksh, Kosovo that only a boy could be born as half-vampir spawn, and one can never spring from a (woman) of a priest's or imam's family.) This dhampir developed the ability to see the invisible presence of (or detect its hidden location of) a vampire and destroy it. and he could pass down this vampire hunter's ability from father to son, down a male-line descent. (Note: "The practice of sorcery for the destruction of vampires is carried on in the house of Dhampir's descendants from father to son, throughout the generations".)

Among the Romani of Serbia, the vampire offspring was considered capable of finding and slaying vampires. That is to say, in Kosovo, a dhampir (specifically a son) was regarded as a "chief magical agent for the destruction of vampires", and sometimes the dhampir was thought to be the only one capable of seeing a vampire.

=== Soft-bodiedness ===
Just as the vampire is held by some to be boneless, the offspring conceived by a vampirized man on his wife will be borne without bones, unable to survive long (the mother having become emaciated before giving birth). The abnormally born vampire child may otherwise be a skin bag full of blood, or a mass of clotted blood (a molo (Note: Ðorđević (1953), p. 180: Not a child but a "моло, то јест 'велики комад крвуждине'".)), be black as coal, already have grown teeth, or be shadowless. (Note: Trbojević (2025) citing Ðorđević (1953), p. 180, Čajkanović (1994), p. 209, and Slobodan Zečević (2008), p. 314) An old anecdote dating to 1731– 1732 in the village of Kukljin (10 kilometres (6.2 mi) east of Medveđa) describes a man who was sucked by a vampire in the guise of a dog, developed a red spot under the right ear, and died. The dead man visited and impregnated his wife, who gave birth to "a monstrous child like a piece of meat" which after 3 days "rolled up like a sausage". (Note: Ðorđević (1953), p. 180: "Исте године [1732] мучио је ноћу вампир двојицу браће у Кукљину, у рамском срезу. Долазио је у виду пса. Једноме је, сисајући га, начинио црвену пегу под де-сним увом и он умре за 3 дана. Тек што је укопан почне он ноћу долазити својој жени и проводити ноћ као обично"; the rest summarized in English by Trbojević (2025)) (Note: In the Medveđa village of the famed Arnold Paole vampire case, another vampire incident recurred in a later year (1731), for which the Austrian authorities similarly dispatched an inquiry team in 1732. The source Ðorđević (1953) recorded that in the same year, this abnormal vampire birth happened in Kukljin, near to Medveđa.)

Jan L. Perkowski adds that the offspring of a union between a vampire-werewolf (vukodlak) and his wife may be born boneless, and J. Gordon Melton writes that in some areas, a true dhampir was held to have a "slippery, jelly-like body and lived only a short life", stemming from the belief that the vampire has no bones. (Note: Cf. "they think that a vampire is like jelly and water" in Upper Great Morava, Kosovo-Metohija.) It is also said that a child born with teeth becomes a vikodlak(var. of vukodlak, the werewolf-vampire), and infants born with teeth or a caul become a vieszcy, the vampire of the Slovenes and Kashubians.

In Bulgarian folklore, possible indicative signs of a vampire offspring include being snub-nosed (chip чип) or noseless, with straight, flattened ears, a soft body, no nails or bones, or having a deep mark on the back, like a tail, and being constantly filthy. However, the snub-nose and soft-bodiedness (jiggly body: "when they walk they shake and sway", no nails, cartilage rather than bone) is also ascribed to the vampir.

=== Vampire-hunting rituals ===
It appears that the vampire hunter's main duty lies in locating the vampir.

The vampire hunter magician hired by the Serbs, Albanians, or Romani, makes a greatly contrived show in front of villagers that he has detected the vampir. The dhampir is pressed by the Muslim Romani to articulate what form the vampire appeared as, whether hen, cock, cat, serpent, man or something else. A practitioner (while whistling like a hunter) would behave as if he is able to spot his mark in the dark (or fog), then to disrobe and look through his sleeve as if a telescope. (Note: Specific to the village of Lešani, i.e., Leshan, Suhareka (Serbian: Lešane, Лешане in the aforementioned Podrima/Podrimlje region) in Vukanović's account (and the encyclopedia citing him). Similarly (yet differently) described for Serbia in by Ornella Volta (1962).) Another antic is for him to declare "the air stinks", then with the upturned head start sniffling, swiveling towards all four cardinal directions. Then a gun may be brought to him to dispatch the target, in which case, the dhampir "falls into a kind of trance at the moment when he fires a gun to destroy the vampire".

A more classic repertoire before guns became popular was for the dhampir engage in Hand-to-hand combat: he would appear as if he is wrestling some invisible enemy until he seems to have torn into pieces, then he would issue a long curious whistle in a manner expressive of his satisfying victory, then exclaim "I have killed it" before the onlooking villagers.

When the Bulgarian vampire hunter spots the vampir, a group posse is usually organized. The Bulgarian glog has the discretion to dictate how the vampir corpse he locates is to be dispatched, but it becomes a group task to hold a public cremation, or to dig out the body and driving a hot skewer into the body, followed by the pouring of hot wine and olive oil; the dispatcher (either a group or the vampiradzhija (Note: Just a variant spelling of the foregoing vampiradzhiya.) himself) may also resort to using firearms.

In the Kosovo–Serbia regions, when the dhampir has completed his vampir hunting tasks, he is customarily served a sumptuous meal, and recompensed for his journey as a reward for the hunt, all paid in cash. Vukanović records that during the interbellum period, the village of Pirani (Piranë) would typically pay 1000 dinars, while Lešani (Leshan) paid the magician 1800 dinars for the extermination.

== In modern culture ==
Blade, the Marvel Comics series, has been described as the most successful title featuring a dhampir character, with the title hero as Vampire Slayer, having been spun off into 3 feature films.

Dhampirs also appear in the works of Scott Baker, Nancy A. Collins (Dhampire: Stillborn 1996), Barb Hendee and J. C. Hendee (Dhampir 2003), Rebecca York (Daywalker, 2006), Richelle Mead, and Stephenie Meyer.

Split is named after the TV series' term for a half-vampire, featuring Ella Rozen and other characters of that fictional species.

Dungeons & Dragons, a fantasy role-playing game, features a playable half-vampire species.

=== Characters ===
- Alucard from the Castlevania video games and TV series
- Blade is a vampire-slaying hero in the Marvel comics and films
- D from the Vampire Hunter D novels and their adaptations
- Donovan Baine from the Darkstalkers video game series
- Dennis Dracula-Loughran, son of Mavis Dracula (a female vampire) and Jonathan Loughran (a male human), from the Hotel Transylvania franchise
- Kagura from OneChanbara Z: Kagura
- Rayne, the red-headed anti-heroine protagonist of the BloodRayne franchise
- Renesmee Cullen from the Twilight novels and films
- Rose Hathaway is the dhampir protagonist of Richelle Mead's Vampire Academy series

== See also ==
- List of vampires
- List of vampiric creatures in folklore
- Cambion
- nephilim
- revenant
- vampire
- vampire pumpkins and watermelons
- werewolf
- zombie
