= Forgotten =

Forgotten or The Forgotten may refer to:

== Places and fictional locations ==
- Forgotten River, New Zealand
- Forgotten Hills, Victoria Land, Antarctica

== People and fictional characters ==
- Bolesław the Forgotten (before 1016–1038 or 1039), a semi-legendary Duke of Poland

== Film ==
- Forgotten (1933 film), an American film directed by Richard Thorpe
- The Forgotten (1973 film), a psychological horror film
- The Forgotten, a 1989 television action film directed by James Keach
- The Forgotten (2003 film), a Korean War film
- The Forgotten (2004 film), a psychological thriller
- Forgotten (2012 film), a Taiwanese/Chinese television film
- Forgotten (2013 film), a Bolivian film
- The Forgotten (2014 film), a British horror film
- Forgotten (2017 film), a South Korean mystery thriller

== Literature ==
- The Forgotten (Applegate novel), a book in the Animorphs series by K. A. Applegate
- The Forgotten (Baldacci novel), a 2012 novel by David Baldacci
- The Forgotten (Wiesel novel), a 1992 novel by Elie Wiesel
- The Forgotten (Hendee novel), a 2017 dark fantasy novella collection by Barb Hendee, part of the Saga of the Noble Dead
- Forgotten (Hendee novel), a 2018 fantasy romance novel by Barb Hendee

== Television ==
- The Forgotten (TV series), an American crime drama
- "The Forgotten" (Batman: The Animated Series), an episode
- "The Forgotten" (The Purge), an episode
- "The Forgotten" (Star Trek: Enterprise), an episode

== Songs ==
- "The Forgotten" (Green Day song), a song by American punk rock band Green Day from their 2012 album ¡Tré!
- "Forgotten", a song by Avail from Satiate
- "Forgotten", a song by Avril Lavigne from Under My Skin
- "Forgotten", a song by The Browning from Burn This World
- "The Forgotten", a song by Bury Your Dead from It's Nothing Personal
- "Forgotten", a song by Candiria from While They Were Sleeping
- "Forgotten", a song by From Ashes to New from The Future
- "Forgotten", a song by Gothminister from Empire of Dark Salvation
- "The Forgotten (Part One)" and "The Forgotten (Part Two)", songs by Joe Satriani from Flying in a Blue Dream
- "The Forgotten", a song by Killswitch Engage from Killswitch Engage (2009 album)
- "Forgotten", a song by Korn from Requiem
- "Forgotten (Lost Angels)", a song by Lamb of God from Sacrament, 2006
- "Forgotten", a song by Linkin Park from Hybrid Theory
- "Forgotten", a song by The Plot in You from Vol. 1

== Other uses ==
- The Forgotten (band), a punk rock music band
- Age of Empires II: The Forgotten, a videogame expansion pack

== See also ==
- Forgetting
- Forgotten One (disambiguation)
- Forgotten war (disambiguation)
