= Gone, But Not Forgotten =

Gone But Not Forgotten may refer to:

== Arts and entertainment ==
=== Films ===
- Gone, But Not Forgotten (film), a 2003 film by Michael D. Akers
- Gone, But Not Forgotten, a 2004 television film based on the Margolin novel; directed by Armand Mastroianni

=== Literature ===
- Gone, But Not Forgotten (novel), a 1993 novel by Phillip Margolin

=== Music ===
- "Gone But Not Forgotten" (song), a 2021 song by Brantley Gilbert from So Help Me God
- "Gone But Not Forgotten", a song by Rick Wakeman from The Cost of Living
- "Gone But Not Forgotten", a song by TQ from Listen
- "Gone But Not Forgotten", song by Johnny Cash, live at the Carter Family Fold

=== Television episodes ===
- "Arirang; Gone, But Not Forgotten", Goodbye Earth episode 7 (2024)
- "Gone But Not Forgotten", Bates Motel season 2, episode 1 (2014)
- "Gone But Not Forgotten", Beggar My Neighbour series 1, episode 4 (1967)
- "Gone, But Not Forgotten", Dallas series 5, episode 2 (1981)
- "Gone But Not Forgotten", Down to Earth (2000) series 2, episode 8 (2001)
- "Gone But Not Forgotten", Fraggle Rock season 5, episode 7 (1987)
- "Gone But Not Forgotten", Growing Pains season 3, episode 8 (1987)
- "Gone, but Not Forgotten", My Favorite Martian season 2, episode 23 (1965)
- "Gone But Not Forgotten", Quincy, M.E. season 3, episode 18 (1978)
- "Gone But Not Forgotten", Solved season 2, episode 2 (2009)
- "Gone, But Not Forgotten", Sorry! series 6, episode 4 (1987)
- "Gone But Not Forgotten", The Adventures of Tom Sawyer (1960) episode 4 (1960)
- "Gone But Not Forgotten", The Strain season 3, episode 4 (2016)
- "Gone But Not Forgotten", We'll Think of Something episode 5 (1986)
- "Gone But Not Forgotten", Yancy Derringer episode 33 (1959)

=== Visual arts ===
- Gone, But Not Forgotten (Waterhouse painting), 1873

== Other uses ==
=== Television episodes with title plays ===
- "Gauntlet, But Not Forgotten", Aaron Stone season 2, episode 3 (2010)
- "Gondola, But Not Forgotten", Dinky Dog episode 26 (1979)
- "Gone But Not Faygotten", Wings (1990) season 6, episode 18 (1995)
- "Gone But Not Four-Gotten", Seven Little Monsters season 3, episode 4b (2003)
- "Grown, But Not Forgotten", The New Adventures of Winnie the Pooh season 4, episode 2 (1991)

== See also ==
- "But Not Forgotten", Falcone episode 7 (2000)
- "But Not Forgotten", Law & Order: Criminal Intent season 3, episode 4 (2003)
- "But Not Forgotten", Street Legal (Canadian) season 8, episode 4 (1993)
- "But Not Forgotten", The Bill series 9, episode 106 (1993)
- Gone
- Forgotten
