= Hendee =

Hendee is a surname. Notable people with the surname include:

- Barb Hendee, author
- George M. Hendee (1866–1943), co-founder of the Indian Motocycle Manufacturing Company in Springfield, Massachusetts, USA
- George Whitman Hendee (1832–1906), U.S. politician, former Governor of Vermont, former U.S. Representative from Vermont
- J. C. Hendee, author
- Kirby Hendee (1923–2016), American politician and lawyer
