= Vampire pumpkins and watermelons =

Balkan folk legend

Vampire Fruit/Vegetables
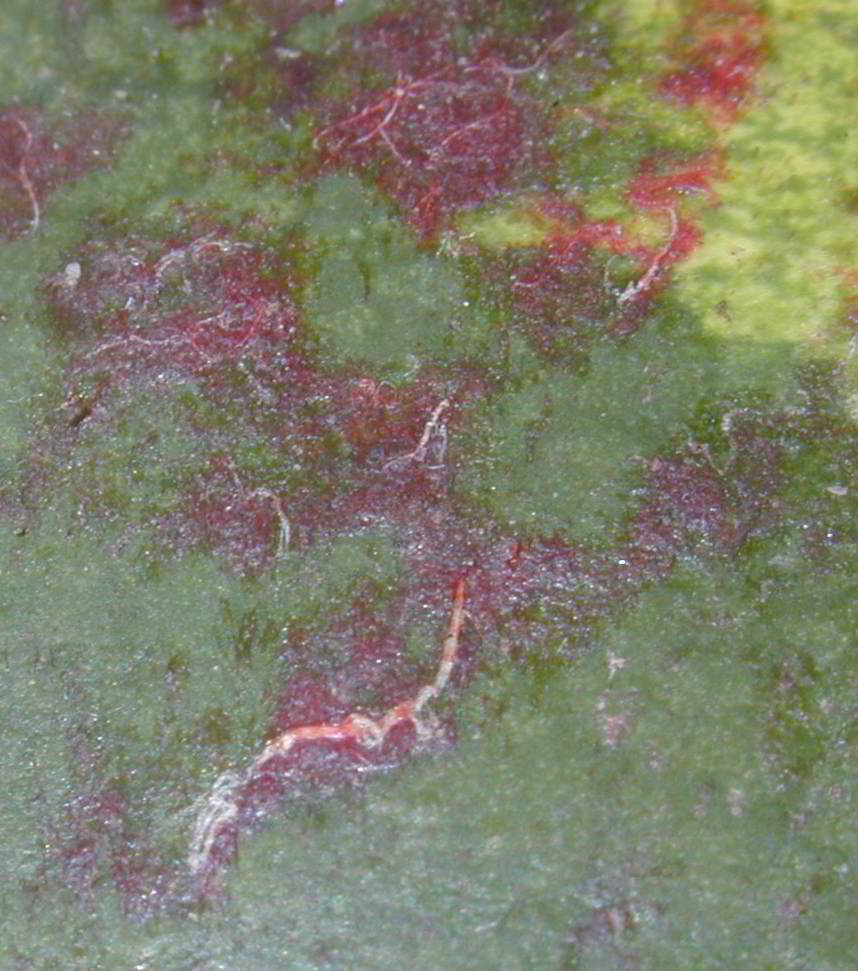
- "Blood" forms naturally on a few square centimeters of the outside of an aged watermelon. Another picture shows the whole melon

Creature information
- Grouping: Folklore
- Sub grouping: Vampire

Origin
- Country: Various
- Region: Balkans

Vampire pumpkins and watermelons (and melons) are a part of Muslim Romani (Gypsie) vampire legend from the Kosovo-Metohija province, Serbia, described by ethnologist Tatomir Vukanović.

The transformation of a pumpkin or melon (of all kinds) occur when they fight each other. The vampirized pumpkin/melon retains the original appearance as vegetable, but if a trace of blood could be detected on it this is a sign it has turned vampire.

According to the superstition among the Muslim Gypsies in the Podrima/Podrimlje and Prizrenski Podgor regions, it is claimed that a pumpkin kept in the field for ten days before gathering can turn vampire. Or it vampirizes if it is kept (in its pumpkin patch) until after Christmas, according to the local lore of Pirani/Piranë, Podrima. A dried pumpkin-syphon left unopened for 3 years turns vampire, according to the lore of Gypsies in "Lešani" (Leshan, Suhareka), in the Podrima region. (Note: Vukanović (1976) [1958]: The belief in vampires of plant origin occurs among Gs. [*Gypsies] who belong to the Mosl[em] faith in KM [*Kosovo-Metohija]. According to them there are only two plants which are regarded as likely to turn into vampires: pumpkins of every kind and water-melons. And the change takes place when they are 'fighting one another.' In Podrima and Prizrenski Podgor they consider this transformation occurs if these ground fruit have been kept for more than ten days: then the gathered pumpkins stir all by themselves and make a sound like 'brrrl, brrrl, brrrl!' and begin to shake themselves. It is also believed that sometimes a trace of blood can be seen on the pumpkin, and the [Gypsies] then say it has become a vampire. These pumpkins and melons go round the houses, stables, and rooms at night, all by themselves, and do harm to people. But it is thought that they cannot do great damage to folk, so people are not very afraid of this kind of vampire. Among the Mosl[em] [Gypsies] in the village of Pirani [*Piranë] (also in Podrima) it is believed that if pumpkins are kept after Christmas they turn into vampires, while [Leshan's] (Note: "the Lešani Gs.", i.e., gypsies from the village of "Lešani" in Podrima (Podrimlje) region.) [Gypsies] think that this phenomenon occurs if a pumpkin used as a siphon, when ripe and dry, stays unopened for three years. — Tatomir Vukanović, Journal of the Gypsy Lore Society)

The animated vampiric pumpkin shakes and shivers, making growling sounds ("brrrl, brrrl, brrrl!"), and go around (roll around) houses, stables, and rooms, inflicting harm, though only causing minor damage, not enough to terrorize local villagers.

These pieces of folklore were collected by Tatomir Vukanović in his fieldwork in around Kosovo and adjoining northwesterly provinces during the years 1933–1948 and in 1947, 1948. (Note: His work, "Vampire" appeared serialized in Journal of the Gypsy Lore Society, 1957–1959, and later reprinted in the appendix of Perkowski 1976, pp. 274–318 Cf. Dhampir.)

== In popular culture ==
Terry Pratchett's comic fantasy novel Carpe Jugulum (1998) makes mention of "vampire watermelons". Pratchett has acknowledged that he did not invent the vampire tools and watermelons, and these come from "real world beliefs". (Note: As for vampiric agricultural tools, cf. Vukanović or Perkowski)

The webcomic Digger incorporates a field of vampire squash (most of which resemble butternut squashes in appearance).

== See also ==
- dhampir

== Bibliography ==
- Bunson, Matthew (2000). The Vampire Encyclopedia. Gramercy. ISBN 9780517162064.
- Perkowski, Jan L. (1976). Vampires of the Slavs. Cambridge, Mass.: Slavica Publishers. ISBN 978-0893570262. (alt@google)
- Vukanović, T. P. (1957–1959). "The Vampire (in three parts)" Journal of the Gypsy Lore Society 36 (1957): 125–133; 37 (1958): 21−31, 111−118; 38 (1959): 44-45, reprinted in Perkowski (1976), pp. 274–318. (excerpts)
