= Perkowski =

Perkowski (Polish feminine: Perkowska; plural: Perkowscy) is a surname. Notable people with the surname include:

- David Perkowski (born 1947), American swimmer
- Harry Perkowski (1922–2016), American baseball player
- Jack Perkowski, American businessman and writer
- Jan L. Perkowski, American academic and writer
- Piotr Perkowski (1901–1990), Polish composer
