= The Process of Self-Development =

Studio album by Candiria
- Released: August 3, 1999
- Recorded: Purple Light Studios, Brooklyn, New York
- Genre: Hardcore punk; hip hop; heavy metal; jazz
- Length: 68:20
- Label: MIA
- Producer: Michael Barile

Candiria chronology
Beyond Reasonable Doubt (1997)	The Process of Self-Development (1999)	300 Percent Density (2001)

Professional ratings
Review scores
Source	Rating
Allmusic	3/5 stars

The Process of Self-Development is the third studio album by Candiria. It was released on August 3, 1999, on the short-lived MIA label, before the band moved to Century Media Records. Allmusic reviewer Heather Phares wrote that the album "pack[s] a punch and bring[s] the funk".

== Track listing ==
1. "Three Times Again" – 5:51
2. "Onefortyeight" – 1:47
3. "Pull" – 3:55
4. "Method of Expression" – 3:55
5. "Temple of Sickness" – 6:21
6. "Mathematics" – 6:37
7. "Work in Progress" – 6:58
8. "Matter.Anti.Matter" – 5:33
9. "Cleansing" – 3:38
10. "Elevate in Madness" – 5:10
11. "Down to the Last Element" – 5:47
12. "The Process of Self-Development" – 8:27
13. "Leaving the Atmosphere" – 4:21

== Personnel ==
- Carley Coma - vocals
- John Lamacchia - guitar, 10 string electric guitar, acoustic guitar
- Michael MacIvor - 5 string fretted and fretless bass
- Eric Matthews - guitar
- Kenneth Schalk - drums, percussion, rhodes keyboard, bubblewrap, didgeridoo

=== Additional musicians ===
- Tim Byrnes - trumpet (track 2, 4, 6, 9, 11)
- Kevin Greenland - bagpipes (track 6)
