= Vampire plant =

Vampire plants might refer to:

- Parasitic plants, which suck nutrients from their hosts
- Vampire pumpkins and watermelons, a folk legend about plants that turn into vampires
