= Kiss the Lie =

Studio album by Candiria
- Released: October 27, 2008
- Recorded: Purple Light Studios, Jupiter 4 Studios
- Genre: Alternative metal
- Length: 58:06
- Label: Type A

Candiria chronology
What Doesn't Kill You... (2004)	Kiss the Lie (2008)	While They Were Sleeping (2016)

Kiss the Lie is the sixth album by Candiria. The band began writing material for the album in 2005 and recorded it at Jupiter 4 Studios, a studio owned and operated by Ken and Steve Schalk, as well as Purple Light Studios, where the band had recorded in the past. The album was completed in 2006, but the label choose not to release it for years due to the band's inability to tour in support of the new release. The album was made released on iTunes on October 27, 2008.

The original digital version of the album was not mastered, some song titles were incorrect, and the song "Reflection Eleven" appears twice on the album (incorrectly titled "That Which Consumes in its second appearance). The band subsequently resolved the issues and released a double vinyl with new artwork by Seldon Hunt, mastered tracks, corrected song titles, alternate endings to select songs and a bonus track in 2009. The vinyl release also contains a CD-R copy of the album in its final form. An 11 track version of the album is available on streaming services.

== Track listing ==
1. "Icarus Syndrome" - 6:42
2. "Sirens" - 4:15
3. "Reflection Eleven" - 6:25
4. "The Sleeper" - 5:52
5. "Legion" - 5:59
6. "Alicia" - 1:33
7. "A Rose Dies in Eden" - 4:08
8. "Genuine" - 5:45
9. "Splinter" - 4:57
10. "Ascend" - 3:36
11. "Colby" - 2:23
12. "That Which Consumes" - 6:31

Total length: 58:06
