= Start the Healing =

2021 song by Korn

Single by Korn

from the album Requiem
- Released: November 11, 2021
- Recorded: 2021
- Studio: Buck Owens Studio, Bakersfield, California
- Genre: Nu metal; hard rock
- Length: 3:28
- Label: Loma Vista
- Songwriters: Jonathan Davis; James Shaffer; Brian Welch; Reginald Arvizu; Ray Luzier; Lauren Christy
- Producer: Chris Collier

Korn singles chronology
"Finally Free" (2020)	"Start the Healing" (2021)	"Worst Is On Its Way" (2022)

Music video
- "Start the Healing" on YouTube

"Start the Healing" is a song by American nu metal band Korn, released as the first single from their fourteenth studio album Requiem. The song topped Active Rock chart in mid-February.

== Background ==
Just like as was done with "You'll Never Find Me", the lead single from their prior album, the release of this single came alongside the revealing of the album cover for Requiem, the album's release date and its track listing, revealing "Start the Healing" to be the third track on the album.

== Music video ==
The music video for "Start the Healing" was directed by Tim Saccenti, known for his work with Run the Jewels, Flying Lotus and Depeche Mode. 3D artist Anthony Ciannamea also assisted with visuals. The music video was leaked a day ahead of its intended release, revealing Fieldy's absence from the video. It amassed over 500,000 views within the first 24 hours of its official release.

Featuring scenes described as "ethereal" and "otherworldly", the music video is largely influenced by surrealism and body horror. The band is seen playing throughout, among the presence of humanoid entities, mutating beasts, and what appear to be aliens.

"Our idea for this video was to mutate that aspect of the DNA of Korn, of what makes them so inspiring, their mix of raw power and transportive aesthetics and human emotion.

I wanted to take the viewer on an emotional journey, as the song does, a visceral, cathartic death and rebirth that will hopefully help transport the listener through whatever their personal struggles are.

Collaborating with 3D artist Anthony Ciannamea, we tapped into Korn's mythology and explored their vast well of light and darkness to create a surreal, liminal-pace body-horror nightmare."

- Tim Saccenti

== Promotion ==
Korn had teased the release of this single earlier in the month through purchasing billboards worldwide featuring the band's logo on a gray static background, with a QR code and the song's name in the lower right quadrant. Specific sightings of billboards had been made in Camden, London, and Crowbar, Sydney. Upon scanning this QR code, mobile telephone users would be redirected to an augmented-reality Instagram filter featuring a 3D model of a hand grasping a baby's face from the top, a graphic which would be later revealed to be the focus of the Requiem album cover. This filter was also posted about by the band's associated social media accounts.

Cryptic promotional video snippets by the band heavily referenced "11:11", which would eventually turn out to be the release date of the song, as well as the symbol for infinity.

== Composition ==
The start of the song features a gradually loudening, staccato guitar riff.

A "rollercoaster in dynamics", the song is said to evoke what is described as a "push-pull dynamic to create a sense of nervous tension".

Jonathan Davis' vocals on this song, particularly in the verses, are said to be relatively soft, contrasting against the harsher tone of the instrumentation. The vocals during the chorus, however, feature a much more intense vocal performance backed by "powerchords and massive-sounding octave lines".

Davis' vocals later turn into characteristically much more raspy yells during the bridge.

== Reception ==
While mostly positively received, accounts of its connection to Korn's earlier material has been mixed. A Brooklyn Vegan review of the single states it "nails a balance between sounding like classic Korn and feeling fresh", with Rock Cellar Magazine reinforcing this sentiment, comparing it to a mixture between more recent albums and Untouchables. It has also been considered a return to their roots. A Louder Sound review, contrarianly, asserts "it doesn't really sound like a Korn song." The song's hook appears to be one of its most widely praised aspects.

Axl Rosenberg of MetalSucks, though by his own admission not a Korn fan, wrote highly of the song, saying it "might be the best thing they’ve ever done."

It was elected by Loudwire as the 19th best metal song of 2021.

== Personnel ==
Korn

- Jonathan Davis – lead vocals
- James "Munky" Shaffer – guitars
- Brian "Head" Welch – guitars
- Reginald "Fieldy" Arvizu – bass
- Ray Luzier – drums

Other personnel

- Chris Collier - production, recording producer
- David Benveniste – production, executive producer
- James Harley – studio personnel, recording engineer
- Rich Costey – studio personnel, mixing
- Jeff Citron – studio personnel, assistant mixer
- Koby Berman – studio personnel, assistant mixer
- Vlado Meller – studio personnel, mastering engineer
- Lauren Christy – composition, lyrics

== Charts ==
=== Weekly charts ===
Weekly chart performance for "Start the Healing"
Chart (2021–2023)	Peak position
Australia Digital Tracks (ARIA)	49
Czech Republic Rock (IFPI)	7
German Alternative Singles (GfK)	1
US Hot Rock & Alternative Songs (Billboard)	32
US Rock & Alternative Airplay (Billboard)	8

=== Year-end charts ===
Year-end chart performance for "Start the Healing"
Chart (2022)	Position
US Rock Airplay (Billboard)	34
