= Dhampire: Stillborn =

Title of a graphic novel by Nancy A. Collins & Paul Lee

- Dhampire: Stillborn (Sep. 1996), cover art by Paul Lee.
- Date: September 1996
- Series: Dhampire
- Page count: 64 pages
- Publisher: Vertigo

Creative team
- Writers: Nancy A. Collins
- Artists: Paul Lee
- Letterers: Comicraft; Richard Starkings
- Colourists: Paul Lee
- Creators: Nancy A. Collins
- Editors: Lou Stathis; Axel Alonso
- ISBN: 1-56389-256-1

Dhampire: Stillborn, also known simply as Dhampire, is an American graphic novel published in 1996 by Vertigo, an imprint of DC Comics. The series was created by horror writer Nancy A. Collins and was painted by artist Paul Lee.

The Dhampire series was intended to continue beyond this one-shot graphic novella, but as of 2022 there have been no further stories published due to several problematic circumstances.

== Background and creation ==
In June 1994, at an art opening, author Nancy A. Collins ran into her friend, DC Comics editor Lou Stathis, who asked her to write a "Gothic" graphic novel about vampires that would appeal to Generation X. Collins, whose recently completed novel Paint it Black included the "dhampire" character Jen, immediately suggested incorporating a similar half-human, half-vampire character into the story, an idea which Stathis liked.

Days after this impromptu meeting, Collins began writing notes towards a preliminary proposal, including story concepts and possible character names. According to these notes, Collins' protagonist would have the surname "Gaunt" and the given name of "Nicholas", "Natalie", or some other name beginning with "N". She'd chosen the name "Gaunt" as the word connoted "thinness and pallor, qualities associated with the 'undead'", as well as in reference to H. P. Lovecraft's nightgaunt creation. Collins ultimately settled on the first name "Nicholas" because Nick is a nickname for the devil in Christianity, she'd recently seen Nicholas Nickleby, and as a tribute to Jack Nicholson.

On June 25, 1994, Collins hand-wrote a draft letter to Stathis, in which she proposed "the idea of an alienated 'slacker' who discovers under hypnosis that the woman he thinks is his mother is really his grandmother and that his real mother is a teenager who was bitten by a vampire when she was pregnant, giving him vampire traits, and who later becomes a vampire after being shot and killed by cops". Also included in this letter were various titles that Collins was considering, specifically Dhampire, Dhampir, Vampire X, Bleake, and Ghaunt. On October 2, Collins sent a formal proposal of her concept to Stathis. After the project's approval by DC Comics, Collins created a script breakdown and then a full-fledged script with Stathis strictly "fixing and tightening language and improving the flow of the narrative".

In January 1996, Paul Lee was approached by DC Comics to illustrate Dhampire: Stillborn. Upon Lee's acceptance of the position, Stathis provided the artist with written character descriptions, a story synopsis, and a scene-by-scene breakdown, from which Lee created sketches for approval. Once his sketches were approved, Lee painted each of the panels for the finished work.

In July 1996, at which point the project's editing was already completed, Stathis was diagnosed with terminal brain cancer causing Axel Alonso to step-in and supervise the production's final stages.

== Publication history and marketing ==
Dhampire: Stillborn was a 64-page squarebound graphic novel written by Nancy A. Collins, illustrated by Paul Lee, and published by Vertigo, an imprint of DC Comics. It was cover dated November 1996 but its on-sale date was September 25. As was standard for Vertigo-branded comic books, this one-shot was not approved by the Comics Code Authority and instead bore the pre-DC Comics rating system label of "Suggested for Mature Readers".

In 1996, an "On the Ledge" feature about Dhampire: Stillborn was included in all of November's cover-dated monthly Vertigo issues and full-color house ads for it appeared in the October and November cover-dated issues of Essential Vertigo: The Sandman. In 2000, art from Dhampire: Stillborn was reprinted in the Vertigo Visions: Artwork from the Cutting Edge of Comics hardcover.

== Legal dispute ==
In November 1996, the co-creators of the then-unpublished comic book Matchsticks, Francis Hogan and Daniel Masucci, filed a federal court complaint of copyright infringement and idea misappropriation on the part of Dhampire: Stillborn against DC Comics, Warner Communications, Inc., Time Warner Entertainment Co., L.P., Nancy A. Collins, and Paul Lee. The grounds for the suit were similarities between the two books' protagonists and premises, specifically regarding how both centered around a half-vampire named Nicholas Gaunt who uncovers his supernatural origins. Furthermore, Hogan and Masucci had made a "professional submission" of Matchsticks in August or September 1994 to DC Comics, specifically to then-assistant editor Axel Alonso, who would later work on Dhampire: Stillborn in its final stages.

On February 28, 1997, Judge Thomas McAvoy of the Northern District of New York dismissed part of the suit but upheld the copyright infringement claim. On September 2, Judge McAvoy granted a motion for reconsideration but denied a motion for summary judgment, as he determined that the two works could be substantially similar. On January 26, 1999, the case was transferred to Judge Shira Scheindlin of the Southern District of New York who reviewed both books thoroughly and determined that they were not substantially similar. Furthermore, Judge Scheindlin accepted proof that Collins had created the idea independently, specifically noting a written proposal for Dhampire that was submitted to DC Comics prior to Hogan and Masucci's submission of Matchsticks to the company. As such, Judge Scheindlin granted the motion for summary judgment and dismissed the case.

== Synopsis ==
At birth, Nicholas Gaunt is mistaken as stillborn until an orderly, who took the seemingly-dead baby to the morgue, discovered otherwise. Gaunt develops into a troubled child, exhibiting behavioral problems such as killing small animals, attempting suicide, and fighting schoolmates, which culminates in him being expelled after biting a fellow student on the neck. After his third suicide attempt, Gaunt is committed to a psychiatric ward under the care of Dr. Merrick, who uses hypnotherapy to unlock Gaunt's repressed memory of an older sister named Natalie trying to abduct him when he was three-years-old.

With Gaunt gaining an interest in uncovering more about this memory, which Dr. Merrick equates with increased psychological health, Gaunt is released from the hospital and immediately travels to his mother's house to confront her about the incident. Gaunt's mother reveals that she is actually his grandmother and that Natalie was his birth-mother, though that she has been dead for twenty years. In light of this new information, Gaunt begins a search, accompanied by a stripper named Tanith, for his father.

While visiting his mother's grave, Gaunt encounters Natalie, who is a vampire and has recently killed Tanith, turning her into one of the undead. Natalie reveals that she was bitten by the vampire Iscariot while pregnant, causing her unborn child to become a half-human, half-vampire hybrid known as a "dhampire". She also explains that in order for a dhampire to become a full-vampire, it must commit hideous crimes and suffer a violent death, which Gaunt proceeds to do. Rising from the dead a full-vampire, Gaunt is greeted by Tanith and his mother, who asks if he's ready to meet Iscariot.

== Sequel ==
Near the end of 1994, the editor of Dhampire: Stillborn at DC Comics, Lou Stathis, asked Nancy A. Collins to develop the originally commissioned one-shot graphic novel into a monthly series. Over the next four to six weeks, Collins devised plot outlines for three or four story arcs, each of which would be three or four issues in length. This planned continuation followed the book's protagonist, Nicholas Gaunt, delving more into vampire society, eventually killing his birth-mother, Natalie, and her vampiric "sire", Iscariot. After Collins had completed the script for issue two and artist Ted Naifeh had produced preliminary sketches for the monthly series, DC Comics cancelled it prior to any formal announcement.

In 1997, pending a dismissal of a then-ongoing legal dispute, Collins tentatively planned a follow-up titled Dhampire: Heir Apparent which would've taken "the character & storyline into what (I hope) will be highly unexpected territory for readers". As of 2022, no new Dhampire comic books have been published.

The lack of any published sequels has been variably attributed to three problematic factors: the terminal health diagnosis of the project's editor, Lou Stathis; the collapse of the comic book speculator market; and the legal issue concerning the title. Furthermore, Collins was unable to continue Dhampire without DC Comics, as the company co-owned the copyright, though she did repurpose concepts from it in her young adult fiction series Vamps, specifically the idea of a vampire society divided between New Bloods and Old Bloods that are reigned over by a synod as well as the half-vampire protagonist who must deny her human heritage in order to be accepted.

== See also ==
- List of dhampirs
