= Topliçan =

Topliçan: Topliçan (Albanian); Топличане/Topličane (Serbian)
- Village
- Location in Kosovo
- Location: Kosovo
- District: Prizren
- Municipality: Therandë
- Elevation: 413 m (1,355 ft)
- Time zone: UTC+1 (CET)
  - Summer (DST): UTC+2 (CEST)

Topliçan is a settlement in the Therandë/Suhareka municipality in Kosovo. It lies 413 m above sea level. It has an ethnic Albanian majority, and Serbian minority; in the 1981 census, it had 307 inhabitants. It has been registered with Leshan in the censuses.

Demographic history
Ethnic group	1948	1953	1961	1971	1981	1991
Albanians					267	
Serbs					31	
Montenegrins					9	
Total	N/A	N/A	N/A	N/A	307	N/A
