= Candiria =

American metal band

- Origin: New York City, U.S.
- Genres: Progressive metal; jazz fusion; metalcore; mathcore; hip hop
- Years active: 1992–present
- Labels: Too Damn Hype, Devastating Soundworks, MIA, Century Media, Earache, Lakeshore, Metal Blade
- Members: Carley Coma; John LaMacchia; Michael MacIvor; Julio Arias; Danny Grossarth
- Past members: Chris Puma; Eric Matthews; Eddie Ortiz; Robert Corbino; Kenneth Schalk

Candiria is an American band from Brooklyn, New York, mixing progressive metal, metalcore, jazz fusion and hip hop. They are part of the precursors of the mathcore genre with bands like Deadguy or Lethargy. Formed in 1992, the band was part of the second wave of New York hardcore, but subsequently expanded its performance to also play jazz, hip hop and progressive rock.

The band was founded by vocalist Carley Coma, guitarists Chris Puma and Eric Matthews, and drummer/bassist/keyboardist/trumpeter Kenneth Schalk.

== History ==
Candiria was initially formed in 1992 by vocalist Carley Coma, guitarists Chris Puma and Eric Matthews, and drummer/bassist/keyboardist/trumpeter Kenneth Schalk. "Candiria" is supposedly the plural form of candiru, a parasitic fish found in the Amazon river. However, original member Kenneth Schalk stated that the band made up their name while unaware of the fish. The alleged plural is incorrect anyway: the name of the fish comes from the now extinct Old Tupi language, from where it passed on to Portuguese and later to other languages; in Portuguese, the plural form is simply candirus. The band formed in the second wave of New York hardcore.

Their first album Surrealistic Madness was released by Too Damn Hype Records in 1995. Chris Puma was replaced by John LaMacchia in 1997, just before their second album Beyond Reasonable Doubt. The band then moved to M.I.A. Records, which released their third album The Process of Self-Development in 1999, and Century Media released their fourth album 300 Percent Density in 2001. That album reached No. 44 on the Billboard Independent Albums chart.

On September 9, 2002, Candiria was in a serious accident near Cleveland, Ohio while driving their touring van. A tractor trailer rear-ended the band's equipment trailer, which then caused the van to flip over several times, eventually landing on its roof. Four members of the band were ejected from the vehicle, and all members plus their driver were hospitalized for serious injuries. Candiria then went through a long and painful recovery period. The band was rumored to be paid $29 million in compensation (pending appeal).

Candiria reemerged in 2004 with the album What Doesn't Kill You..., the cover of which features a photo of the band's van after the 2002 accident. The album indicated a more melodic direction for the band, which received varying amounts of criticism and praise from different sides. The album reached No. 47 on the Billboard Independent Albums chart. John LaMacchia temporarily quit the band for personal reasons after the album's release. Their next album Kiss the Lie was delayed for several years as the band continued to recover from the 2002 accident. LaMacchia returned during the recording process, but guitarist Eric Matthews quit the band, due in part to the continuing effects of his injuries. Drummer Kenneth Schalk departed during this period as well.

By March 2009, Carley Coma and John LaMacchia were the only remaining members of Candiria. Coma had stated that any future Candiria efforts would most likely be electronica-based projects as they were without a rhythm section. However, bassist Michael MacIvor had been helping out since 2007 and became a permanent member in 2009. Guitarist Eddie Ortiz also joined during this period, and original drummer Kenneth Schalk returned to the band. Their sixth studio album Kiss the Lie was released in 2009. Also starting in 2009, LaMacchia and Schalk created a series of albums titled Toying with the Insanities in which old Candiria songs are remixed in collaboration with notable DJs and producers.

Original guitarist Chris Puma died of undisclosed causes on September 20, 2009. On April 29, 2014, Candiria released a two track 7-inch entitled Invaders, their first new material in five years. In April and May 2015 Candiria made their first live appearances in New York City in a decade. Kenneth Schalk quit the band again due to family commitments in July 2016, and was replaced by Danny Grossarth. Guitarist Eddie Ortiz also quit the band during this period and was replaced by Julio Arias. Candiria signed with Metal Blade Records in 2015. Their seventh full-length album While They Were Sleeping was released in October 2016. They played on the Vans Warped Tour in 2017.

== Side projects and other bands ==
Kenneth Schalk, Michael MacIvor, and John LaMacchia have been involved in a free-jazz side project named Ghosts of the Canal, who have released two full-length albums, Sessions from the Flats (1999) and Five Episodes from the Subconscious (2002). This project employs unconventional instrumentation like Rhodes and didgeridoo. MacIvor and LaMacchia also formed the classic rock band A Family Plot, and LaMacchia is a member of Spylacopa along with Greg Puciato, Jeff Caxide, and Julie Christmas, which released the albums Spylacopa (2008) and Parallels (2015). Schalk was also a longtime member of the band Fuel.

Carley Coma has performed with the Christian rock band Hope Kills Fear, which was formed to create "emotional, thought-provoking songs to spread a message of hope, faith, strength and perseverance." In 2011, Coma also released one album with the hard rock band Park Lane.

== Musical style ==
The band's music frequently employs dissonance and unusual time signatures, traits more commonly associated with free jazz, in addition to polyrhythms, as well as sonic experimentation and genre-bending. The band has played jazz fusion, funk, hip hop, metalcore, grindcore, progressive rock and progressive metal, among others. The band describes their sound as "urban fusion".

== Band members ==
Current

- Carley Coma — vocals (1992—present)
- John LaMacchia — lead guitar (1997—present)
- Michael MacIvor — bass (1997—present)
- Julio Arias — rhythm guitar (2015—present)
- Danny Grossarth — drums (2016—present)

Former

- Chris Puma — lead guitar (1992–1997; died in 2009)
- Eric Matthews — rhythm guitar (1992–2004), bass (1992–1997)
- Robert Corbino — bass (Warped Tour; 2017)
- Eddie Ortiz — rhythm guitar (2004–2014)
- Kenneth Schalk — drums, keyboards, trumpet (1992–2016), bass (1992–1997)

Timeline

== Discography ==
Studio albums

- Surrealistic Madness (1995, Too Damn Hype Records)
- Beyond Reasonable Doubt (1997, Too Damn Hype Records)
- The Process of Self-Development (1999, M.I.A. Records)
- 300 Percent Density (2001, Century Media Records)
- The C.O.M.A. Imprint (2002, Lakeshore Records)
- What Doesn't Kill You... (2004, Type A Records)
- Kiss the Lie (2008, Rising Pulse Records)
- While They Were Sleeping (2016, Metal Blade Records)

EPs

- Subliminal (EP) (1994, self-released)
- Deep in the Mental (EP) (1995, Devastating Soundworks)

Other releases

- Mathematics [7-inch] (1999, Stillborn Records)
- Toying with the Insanities Volume I [remixes] (2009, Rising Pulse Records)
- Toying with the Insanities Volume II [remixes] (2009, Rising Pulse Records)
- Toying with the Insanities Volume III [remixes] (2010, Rising Pulse Records)
- The Invaders [7-inch] (2014, Rising Pulse Records, Giant MKT)
