= Wilno, Ontario =

Unincorporated settlement in Ontario, Canada

Wilno
- Township (lower-tier)
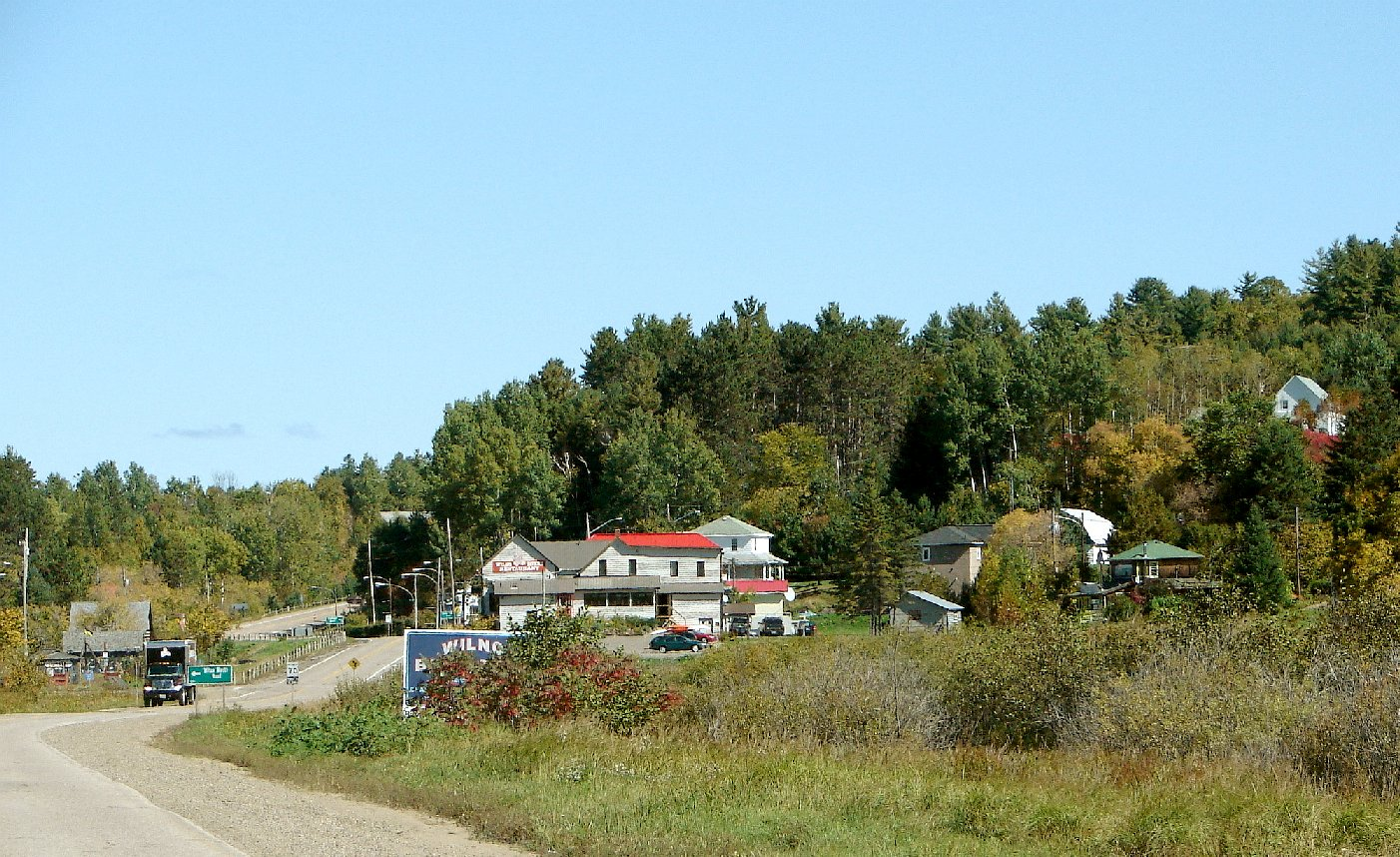
- Wilno, Ontario.

- Location within Renfrew County Location within Southern Ontario
- Coordinates: 45°30′41″N 77°33′37″W
- Country: Canada
- Province: Ontario
- County: Renfrew
- Municipality: Madawaska Valley
- Settled: 1858
- Time zone: UTC-5 (EST)
  - Summer (DST): UTC-4 (EDT)
- Postal Code: K0J
- Area code: 613
- Website: www.wilno.com

Wilno is a settlement in the Township Municipality of Madawaska Valley, Renfrew County, Ontario, Canada.

== Geography ==
Wilno is nestled in the rolling, picturesque terrain of the Madawaska valley which was largely shaped during the demise of the Laurentide Ice Sheet at the end of the last North American Ice Age.

== History ==
Wilno is the first and oldest Polish-Kashubian settlement in Canada. Most of the original settlers in the area came around 1858 from the Polish cultural region of Kashubia. (Prussia had annexed the region from Poland in 1795, but it is now part of Poland again.) They are an integral part of the Kashubian diaspora.

One of the reasons that they chose the area was that the landscape reminded them of their original homes.

Rolling Madawaska Hills Hwy 60

Wilno's namesake was the city of Vilnius, known in Polish as Wilno, which was then in the Russian Empire in an area that used to belong to the Polish–Lithuanian Commonwealth and is now the capital of Lithuania. The city was the birthplace of Reverend Ludwik Dembski, who was a prominent community spiritual leader and town founder, who would not have wanted the town named after himself. Therefore, the townsfolk, grateful for his contributions to their town, may have suggested the name of Wilno.

The St. Stanislaus Kostka Church was built in 1875, destroyed in a fire in 1936 and rebuilt as Saint Mary - Our Lady of Czestochowa. later renamed St. Mary's Catholic Church. The first general store and post office were initially operated by Adam Prince, who became the community's first postmaster in 1885; the settlement was initially named Princetown before being renamed Wilno. Flora's Store was started by Flora Bank in 1937; it was destroyed in a fire in 1940 but rebuilt. The business went through several owners and changes but was closed down in 2015.

In 1894, the Canada Atlantic Railway arrived in the Madawaska Valley. Previously, John Rudolphus Booth's Ottawa, Arnprior and Parry Sound Railway ran through the town mainly serving the lumber industry. The first hotel near the Wilno rail station was the "Stopping Place." A new owner added more rooms and a dining room, and renamed it the "Exchange Hotel." Subsequent owners modified the property, which became the "Wilno Tavern" in 1979 and the "Wilno Tavern Restaurant" more recently. The restaurant remained in operation as of 2020, and Corinne Higgins has owned it since 1981.

The former train route has now been redeveloped into a recreational path. The former train station has an early settler building and museum presenting the early history of the town. The museum and open air wooden skansen (Polish: "open-air museum") contain the history of the first Kashubian people as well as their immigration to Canada, freedom and, after many hardships, their settlement journey to the Wilno area. The Polish Kashub Heritage Museum & Skansen opened in 2002. It is open to visitors during July and August. In May, the annual Kashub Day event is held here.

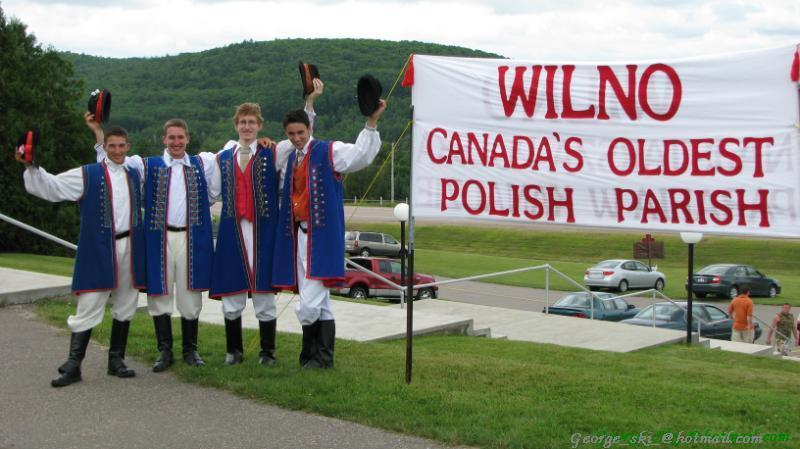
Folk dancers in Wilno on 3 August 2008.

Folk dancers in Wilno on 3 August 2008.

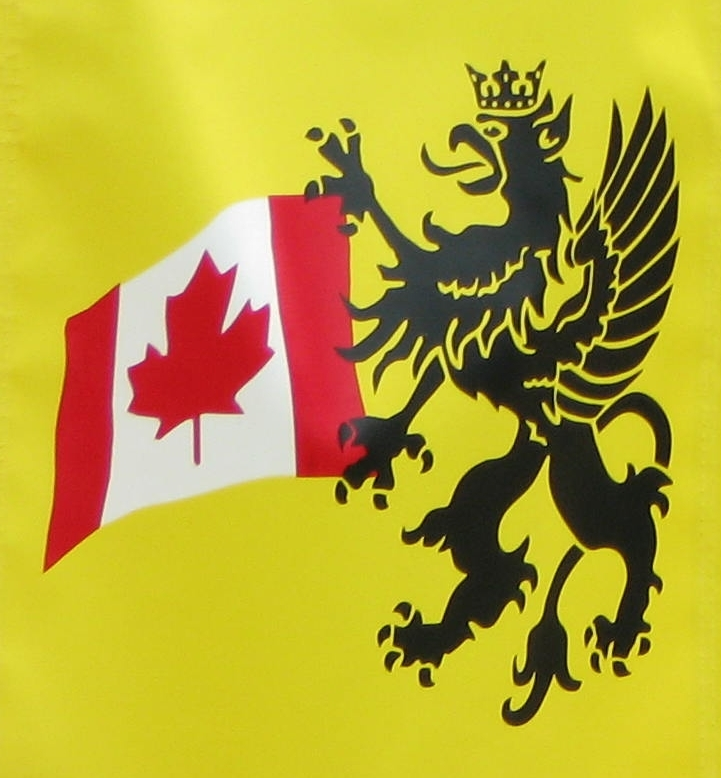
Kashubian griffin.

A professor of Slavic Languages, Jan L. Perkowski, reported on rumours of vampires in the Kashubian culture in a study completed in 1969, and published in a paper titled "Vampires, Dwarves, and Witches among the Ontario Kashubs". According to the professor, the Ontario Kashubs believed that one "must open the tomb of the vampire at midnight, and drive a long nail into his forehead, or, better still, cut off his head with a sharp spade and put it between his feet....". In 1973, a Catholic priest in Wilno told CBC News that "We get a big laugh out of it, we know the people who have manufactured the story just by reading it... My impression is that [Perkowski] probably stuck a microphone under their noses and to get rid of him they'd made up these tales".

In April 2010, Poland's Prime Minister Donald Tusk agreed to visit Wilno but an airplane crash, the Smolensk air disaster, that took the life of President Lech Kaczyński, and that of 95 others, led to cancellation of the plan. Tusk visited Wilno in May 2012, commenting that he was the "first Polish prime minister to meet with the minority living there and cultivating its customs since the 19th century". He toured the Catholic cemetery and later said, "We felt as if we were visiting the graves of our dearest, our relatives, our beloved, because these names, these figures, those stories were our stories."

=== Triple murder ===
In September 2015, three women – Carol Culleton, 66, Anastasia Kuzyk, 36, and Nathalie Warmerdam, 46 – were murdered in and near Wilno. The killer, Basil Borutski, was convicted of the crimes in 2017.

=== Historical plaque ===
The government of Ontario erected a historical plaque in Wilno, providing these specifics:

The first group of Polish immigrants to Canada, some 300 in number, established a settlement in this area in 1864. Adverse social conditions and political unrest in their partitioned homeland had encouraged them to leave. They cleared the land and rapidly established a thriving agricultural community. During the 1880s the village founded here was called Wilno after the birthplace of the Reverend Ludwik Dembski one of their spiritual leaders. In 1875 the parish of Wilno was organized and a chapel dedicated to the polish saint Stanislaus Kostka, was built. The Canadian Atlantic Railway linked Wilno with Ottawa in 1894. This district, which received a new wave of Polish immigrants in the early 1900s, retains much of its cultural heritage.

== Annual Chicken Supper on the Labour Day Weekend ==
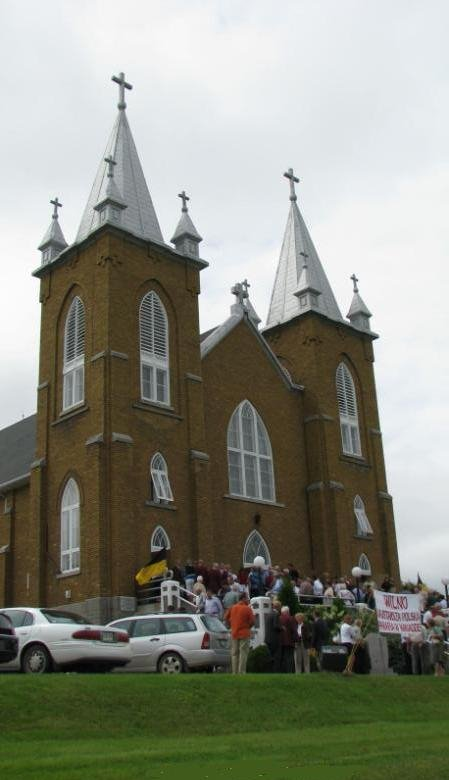
St Mary's Church, Wilno

This supper has been an annual event since 1936. Approximately 2,000 people have been served each year during Labour Day Weekend. The food is authentic Kaszebe–Polish fare; one source states that it includes "boiled chicken, mashed potatoes, gravy, fresh vegetables, such as carrots, cucumbers, tomatoes, pickles, and of course choices of apple, raisin, and coconut cream pies". In 2019, some 3,000 meals were served by volunteers; the 550 pies were also baked by volunteers.

== Notable people ==
- Aloysius Rekowski (1921–2006), priest and historian

== See also ==
- Polish Canadians
- Vilnius
- List of museums in Ontario
