= Aloysius Rekowski =

Canadian Roman Catholic priest and historian

- Born: October 23, 1921; Wilno, Ontario, Canada
- Died: June 17, 2006 (aged 84); Toronto, Ontario, Canada

Aloysius J. Rekowski (1921-2006) was a Canadian Roman Catholic priest, scriptural scholar, historian and translator. He was born to Polish (Kashubian)-Canadian parents on October 23, 1921, in Wilno, Ontario, and died in Toronto, Ontario, on June 17, 2006.

Father Rekowski made his first profession to the Redemptorist missionary order and was ordained a priest in 1948. His vocation led him to many different places, from serving missions out of Athabasca, Alberta, to advanced study at the Lumen Vitae Catethetical Institute in Brussels. His particular field of academic expertise was Scriptural study.

In addition to his pastoral work, Father Rekowski made two notable contributions to Kashubian studies. The first was An 1880 Journey through Kashub, Poland, an English translation of Hieronim Derdowski's epic O Panu Czorlińścim co do Pucka po sece jachoł (Mr. Czorlinsczi Goes To Puck To Buy Fishing Nets), which is regarded as the beginning of Kashubian poetry. In 1997, he published The Saga of the Kashub People in Poland, Canada, U.S.A. In the summer of 2002 a Special Event was held by the Wilno Heritage Society to commemorate Father Rekowski's contribution to Kashubian studies.
