= 300 Percent Density =

Studio album by Candiria
- Released: May 1, 2001
- Genres: Hardcore punk; metalcore; funk; jazz fusion; grindcore; hip hop
- Length: 1:03:59
- Label: Century Media
- Producers: Candiria; Michael Barile

Candiria chronology
The Process of Self-Development (1999)	300 Percent Density (2001)	The C.O.M.A. Imprint (2002)

Professional ratings
Review scores
Source	Rating
AllMusic	4/5 stars
Lambgoat	7/10
Drowned in Sound	9/10

300 Percent Density is an album by Candiria. Released on May 1, 2001, the album peaked at number 44 on the Billboard Independent Albums chart.

== Track listing ==
All lyrics are written by Coma; all music is composed by Candiria.

No.	Title	Length
1.	"300 Percent Density"	6:05
2.	"Signs of Discontent"	3:00
3.	"Without Water"	3:53
4.	"Mass"	1:44
5.	"Constant Velocity Is as Natural as Being at Rest"	4:26
6.	"Words From the Lexicon"	4:42
7.	"Channeling Elements"	5:42
8.	"Advancing Positions"	2:11
9.	"The Obvious Destination"	4:21
10.	"Contents Under Pressure"	6:31
11.	"Opposing Meter"	21:24
Total length:		1:03:59

== Credits ==
Writing, performance and production credits are adapted from the album liner notes.

=== Personnel ===
==== Candiria ====
- Carley Coma – vocals
- John LaMacchia – guitar
- Eric Matthews – guitar
- Michael MacIvor – bass
- Kenneth Schalk – drums

==== Production ====
- Candiria – production, mixing
- Michael Barile – production, engineering, mixing
- Kenneth Schalk – engineering
- Franci D. – engineering
- Roger Lian – mastering

==== Visual art ====
- Coma Graphics – visual concept
- John LaMacchia – photography
- Kenneth Schalk – photography

=== Studios ===
- Purple Light Studios, New York City, NY, United States – recording, mixing
- Masterdisk, New York City, NY, United States – mastering

== Charts ==
Chart	Peak position
US Independent Albums (Billboard)	44
