= What Doesn't Kill You... (Candiria album) =

Studio album by Candiria
- Released: July 13, 2004
- Recorded: Mirror Image Recorders (Studio D)
- Genres: Alternative metal; math rock; jazz metal; hardcore punk
- Length: 36 minutes
- Labels: Type A (US), Earache (UK)
- Producer: David Bendeth

Candiria chronology
The C.O.M.A. Imprint (2002)	What Doesn't Kill You... (2004)	Kiss the Lie (2009)

Singles from What Doesn't Kill You...
- 1. "Blood" Released: 2004; 2. "Down" Released: September 28, 2004; 3. "Remove Yourself" Released: 2005

Professional ratings
Review scores
Source	Rating
Allmusic	3.5/5 stars

What Doesn't Kill You... is an album by Candiria. Released on July 13, 2004, the album peaked at number forty-seven on the Billboard Independent Albums chart. The album was a departure from what Candiria is usually known for with more of a melodic sensibility. The album received critical acclaim with some of its original fan base being somewhat disappointed by the band's shift in musical direction. The album art was inspired by the band's near fatal van accident while on tour supporting their previous release, The C.O.M.A. Imprint. All of the band's members sustained severe injuries after being rear ended by an 18-wheel tractor trailer whose driver fell asleep behind the wheel. The title alludes to Nietzsche's aphorism "What does not kill me makes me stronger".

== Track listing ==
1. "Dead Bury the Dead" - 3:24
2. "The Nameless King" - 3:34
3. "Blood" - 3:16
4. "Remove Yourself" - 3:46
5. "1000 Points of Light" - 4:02
6. "Down" - 3:31
7. "9MM Solution" - 3:37
8. "I Am" - 3:17
9. "Vacant" - 2:59
10. "The Rutherford Experiment" - 5:01

UK bonus tracks:

11. Mathematics (live)
12. Improvisational Jam (live)

== Personnel ==
- Carley Coma - vocals
- John Lamacchia - guitar, backing vocals
- Michael MacIvor - bass, backing vocals
- Eric Matthews - guitar
- Kenneth Schalk - drums, programming
