= Tatomir Vukanović =

Serbian ethnologist (1907–1997)

- Татомир Вукановић
- Born: 1907; Vranje, Serbia, Kingdom of Yugoslavia
- Died: 1997 (aged 89–90)
- Occupation: Ethnologist

Tatomir P. Vukanović (1907–1997) was a Serbian ethnologist of the Balkans region of south-eastern Europe.

Born in Vranje, Southern Serbia, he concentrated on the history, folklore and culture of the Serb and Roma inhabitants of Yugoslavia in general and the southern province of Kosovo.

He wrote about gender issues, most specifically of sworn virgins, the latter due to the fact that he himself was gay which in homophobic Socialist Yugoslavia led to his marginalisation as a scholar and demise from positions of authority to which he had aspired as a Josip Broz Tito's partisan guerrilla petty officer.

== Bibliography ==
- "The Vampire". Four articles in Journal of the Gypsy Lore Society (JGLS) from 1957 to 1960
- "The Gypsy Population in Yugoslavia". JGLS, Third Series, Vol. XLII, Nos. 1-2 (January–April 1963), pp. 10–27.
- "Ritual Communion Among Gypsies in Serbia" (1964). JGLS 43:22
- "Gypsy Pilgrimages to the Monastery of Gračanica in Serbia" (1966). JGLS 45:17
- Romi (Tsigani) u Jugoslaviji. Vranje: Nova Jugoslavija, 1983
