= Forgotten One =

Forgotten One may refer to:

- Forgotten One (character), a superhero in the Marvel Comics universe
- The Forgotten One, a sub-boss in the video game Warcraft III: The Frozen Throne
- The Forgotten One (film), a 1989 film
