= Gone, But Not Forgotten (Waterhouse painting) =

Painting by John William Waterhouse

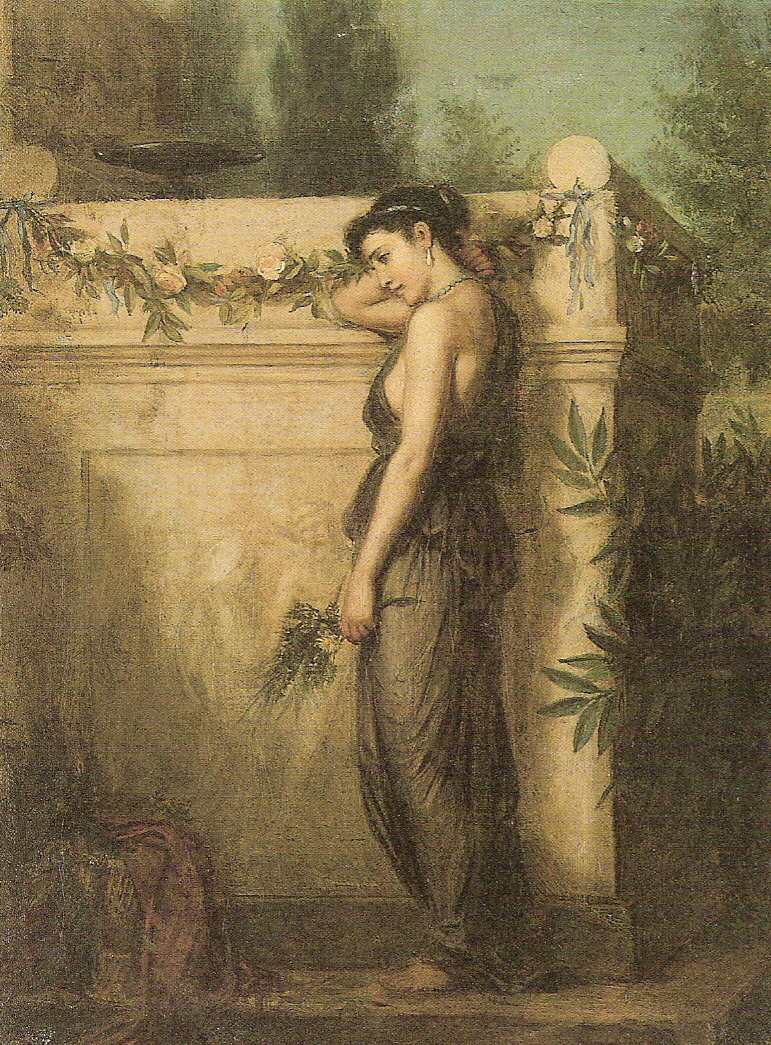
- Artist: John William Waterhouse
- Year: 1873
- Medium: Oil on canvas
- Movement: Romanticism
- Dimensions: 31.8 cm × 25.4 cm (12.5 in × 10.0 in)
- Owner: Private collection

Gone, But Not Forgotten by John William Waterhouse was painted in 1873 during the artist's romantic period. It was exhibited in the winter of 1873 at the Dudley Museum and Art Gallery but is now in a private collection.

The painting depicts only one figure, a woman with a solemn expression leaning against a wall. She is outdoors and wears classical clothing: a chiton which is draped to expose her right shoulder, tainia and some jewellery. She is holding in her left hand some flowers. In front of her is a basket overflowing with a reddish or brown cloth. The overall tone of the painting is consistent with the Romantic movement, which emphasised the human experience and found beauty in that which evokes emotional response.

== See also ==
- Art Renewal Center, Gone, But Not Forgotten
