= Pumpkin Patch =

Pumpkin patch or Pumpkin Patch may refer to:

- A garden where pumpkins are planted, commonly available for sale
- Pumpkin Patch (retailer), a store in New Zealand selling children's clothes
- "Pumpkin Patch" (Scream Queens), the fifth episode of the American television series Scream Queens
- Pumpkin Patch (TV series), a South African children's television series that ran from 1987 to 1991.
