= Requiem (Korn album) =

Studio album by Korn
- Released: February 4, 2022
- Recorded: April–July 2021
- Studios: Buck Owens Studio, Bakersfield, California
- Genres: Nu metal; alternative metal
- Length: 32:36
- Labels: Loma Vista; Concord
- Producers: Chris Collier; Korn

Korn chronology
The Nothing (2019)	Requiem (2022)	Requiem Mass (2023)

Singles from Requiem
- 1. "Start the Healing" Released: November 11, 2021; 2. "Forgotten" Released: January 13, 2022; 3. "Lost in the Grandeur" Released: February 2, 2022; 4. "Worst Is on Its Way" Released: April 12, 2022

Requiem is the fourteenth studio album by American nu metal band Korn. The album was released on February 4, 2022, through Loma Vista and Concord. It was produced by the band and Chris Collier.

== Background and recording ==
The first hint at the release of a fourteenth studio album arose from a since-deleted interview with Kerrang!, in which it was stated that the album was fully written as of April 2021. The COVID-19 pandemic allowed for a surplus of time in which the album could be arranged, alleviating the harsh time constraints which would usually have been imposed. According to a press release:

"It is an album born of time and the ability to create without pressure. Energized by a new creative process free of time constraints, the band was able to do things with Requiem that the past two decades haven't always afforded them, such as taking additional time to experiment together or diligently recording to analog tape – processes which unearthed newfound sonic dimension and texture in their music."

While bassist Reginald "Fieldy" Arvizu announced a hiatus later after this interview, it has been confirmed that his bass tracks will be used on this record. Although he is credited in the album liner notes, he is not included in the band photo. This also marked as Korn's final album with Fieldy, after being confirmed that he's departed from the band in an interview in May 2025.

Little to no new information regarding the album was released until early November, in which several cryptic hints toward the release of new material arose, the first of which involved several billboards involving the band's logo imposed on a background composed of gray static. The bottom-right corner of these billboards featured a QR code, which led to an Instagram filter featuring a 3D model in which a human hand can be seen tightly grasping an infant's head from the top. A close-up of this object is what is used for the album cover.

In addition, the band updated their "The Best of Korn" Spotify playlist with seven cryptic tracks, each spelling "Requiem" letter-by-letter.

The song "Forgotten" was featured in NHL 23.

Requiem is Korn's shortest studio album to date, clocking in at 32 and a half minutes.

== Release and promotion ==
On November 11, 2021, the cryptic teasers eventually culminated in the release of "Start the Healing", the first single released from the album. Alongside the release of this single, many details of the album also came: the cover, in which it is revealed that the baby's head is prominently featured, the track listing, with a total of nine tracks (the fewest across the band's studio discography) and revealing "Start the Healing" to be the third track, and the projected release date of the album being February 4, 2022. The album was made available to pre-order on the same day in several formats, notably including a limited-edition silver vinyl with a total of 1,000 copies.

On January 5, 2022, the band updated their website to show 6 versions of the album artwork, with the lyrics ¨Pulling away this veil I see...¨, and, when clicked on, took you to a video that was an audio track of drummer Ray Luzier tracking drums. Every day, culminating on January 11, they released a new instrumental, with guitars on January 6, bass on January 7, a solo guitar line on January 8, backing vocals on January 9, and then went a day without posting, before releasing the main vocals on January 11. The vocals being released also coincided with the band announcing the second single, "Forgotten", which was released on January 13. A third single, "Lost in the Grandeur", was released on February 2, 2022.

== Reception ==
=== Critical reception ===
Professional ratings
Aggregate scores
Source	Rating
Metacritic	77/100
Review scores
Source	Rating
AllMusic	4/5 stars
Blabbermouth.net	8/10
Classic Rock	3.5/5 stars
Distorted Sound	9/10
DIY	4/5 stars
Exclaim!	7/10
Kerrang!	4/5 stars
Metal Hammer	4/5 stars
Metal Injection	8/10
NME	4/5 stars

According to the review aggregator Metacritic, Requiem received "generally favorable reviews" based on a weighted average score of 77 out of 100 from 7 critic scores. AllMusic gave the album a positive review saying, "Against the odds, Korn have done it again with Requiem, a quick and ferocious blast that finds the band still hungry and innovative nearly 30 years into the game." Wall of Sound gave the album a score 7/10 and saying: "Requiem isn't going to end up listed among the great KoRn albums, but it's short, punchy and hooky. After more than 25 years I reckon that's OK for a band who are comfortable with what they do."

=== Accolades ===
Publication	List	Rank
AllMusic (United States)	AllMusic's Best Metal Albums of 2022	1
Kerrang! (United Kingdom)	The 50 Best Albums of 2022	45
Loudwire (United States)	The 50 Best Rock + Metal Albums of 2022	–
Metal Hammer (United Kingdom)	The Best Metal Albums Of 2022 So Far	–
Revolver (United States)	25 Best Albums of 2022	15

== Commercial performance ==
Requiem debuted at number fourteen on the US Billboard 200 with 23,500 album-equivalent units, of which 20,000 were pure album sales. It is Korn's first album since 1994 to not peak Top-10. As of the end of 2022, the album had sold over 90,000 traditional copies in the US and over 110,000 copies worldwide. In Australia, the album peaked No. 1 for the first time since 2002.

"Start the Healing", the first single off the album, peaked No. 1 on the Mediabase Active Rock chart on February 7, 2022.

== Track listing ==
All tracks are written by Korn, except where noted

Requiem track listing
No.	Title	Writer(s)	Length
1.	"Forgotten"	Korn; Lauren Christy; Jasen Rauch	3:17
2.	"Let the Dark Do the Rest"		3:39
3.	"Start the Healing"	Korn; Christy	3:28
4.	"Lost in the Grandeur"		3:50
5.	"Disconnect"	Korn; Christy	3:26
6.	"Hopeless and Beaten"		4:00
7.	"Penance to Sorrow"		3:20
8.	"My Confession"		3:34
9.	"Worst Is on Its Way"		4:03
Total length:			32:36

Japanese deluxe edition bonus track
No.	Title	Length
10.	"I Can't Feel"	3:11
Total length:		35:47

- A deluxe edition entitled Requiem Mass was released in 2023 that includes five live tracks recorded at the album's 2022 release gig at the Hollywood United Methodist Church.

== Personnel ==
Korn

- Jonathan Davis – vocals
- James "Munky" Shaffer – guitars
- Brian "Head" Welch – guitars
- Reginald "Fieldy" Arvizu – bass on Requiem Studio album
- Roberto "Ra" Díaz – bass on Requiem Mass E.P. album
- Ray Luzier – drums

Additional personnel

- Korn – production, recording production
- Chris Collier – production, recording production
- David Benveniste – executive production
- Vlado Meller – mastering
- Rich Costey – mixing
- James Harley – recording
- Jeremy Lubsey – mastering assistance
- Jeff Citron – mixing assistance
- Koby Berman – mixing assistance
- Johnson Tsang – sculpture, photography
- Christopher Leckie – design, art direction

== Charts ==
=== Weekly charts ===
Weekly chart performance for Requiem
Chart (2022)	Peak position
Australian Albums (ARIA)	1
Austrian Albums (Ö3 Austria)	4
Belgian Albums (Ultratop Flanders)	17
Belgian Albums (Ultratop Wallonia)	5
Canadian Albums (Billboard)	27
Croatian International Albums (HDU)	12
Czech Albums (ČNS IFPI)	79
Danish Vinyl Albums (Hitlisten)	6
Dutch Albums (Album Top 100)	35
Finnish Albums (Suomen virallinen lista)	6
French Albums (SNEP)	26
French Physical Albums (SNEP)	10
German Albums (Offizielle Top 100)	2
Hungarian Albums (MAHASZ)	14
Italian Albums (FIMI)	47
Japanese Albums (Oricon)	50
Japan Hot Albums (Billboard Japan)	43
Polish Albums (ZPAV)	5
Portuguese Albums (AFP)	11
Scottish Albums (Official Charts)	5
Slovak Albums (ČNS IFPI)	85
Spanish Albums (Promusicae)	51
Spanish Physical Vinyl Albums (PROMUSICAE)	18
Swedish Hard Rock Albums (Sverigetopplistan)	8
Swiss Albums (Schweizer Hitparade)	3
Swiss Albums (Romandie)	1
UK Albums (Official Charts)	8
UK Rock & Metal Albums (Official Charts)	1
US Billboard 200	14
US Top Hard Rock Albums (Billboard)	1
US Top Rock Albums (Billboard)	2

=== Year-end charts ===
Year-end chart performance for Requiem
Chart (2022)	Position
US Hard Rock Albums (Billboard)	50
