= While They Were Sleeping =

Studio album by Candiria
- Released: October 7, 2016
- Recorded: Spaceman Sound, Brooklyn
- Genre: Jazz fusion, mathcore, alternative metal, progressive metal
- Length: 49:20
- Label: Metal Blade Records
- Producer: Candiria

Candiria chronology
Kiss the Lie (2009)	While They Were Sleeping (2016)

While They Were Sleeping is the seventh full-length album by Candiria, released in October 2016. This is the first album from the band to not feature founding member and drummer, Ken Schalk. The band supported the album with their performance in the Vans Warped Tour in 2017. A music video was made for the title track.

== Track listing ==
1. "While They Were Sleeping" - 4:42
2. "Mereya" - 4:56
3. "Wandering Light" - 4:12
4. "The Cause" - 2:36
5. "Forgotten" - 3:44
6. "One of You Will Betray Me" - 4:58
7. "Opaque" - 2:56
8. "The Whole World Will Burn" - 4:07
9. "Behind These Walls" - 3:29
10. "With Broken Bones" - 4:16
11. "Ten Thousand Tears" - 4:54
12. "Servitude" - 4:30

== Personnel ==
Candiria

- Carley Coma – vocals, sampling, production
- John Lamacchia – guitar, keyboards, percussion, backing vocals, production
- Michael MacIvor – bass, guitar, backing vocals, production
- Danny Grossarth – drums, production

Additional personnel

- Ken Schalk – percussion
- Andrea Horne – flute, vocals
- Dan Korneff – keyboards
- Adrian Terrazas-Gonzales – saxophone
- Tom Tierney – keyboards, vocals, recording
- Alex Mead-Fox, Tom Tierney – engineering
- Dan Korneff – mixing
- Hans Dekline – mastering
