= The C.O.M.A. Imprint =

Studio album by Candiria
- Released: July 2, 2002; 1997 (Beyond Reasonable Doubt)
- Recorded: Purple Light Studios, Brooklyn, New York
- Genre: Groove metal; hardcore punk; jazz; hip hop
- Length: 65:00 (Beyond Reasonable Doubt); 79:00 (2CDs)
- Label: Lakeshore Entertainment
- Producer: Michael Barile

Candiria chronology
300 Percent Density (2001)	The C.O.M.A. Imprint (2002)	What Doesn't Kill You... (2004)

Professional ratings
Review scores
Source	Rating
Allmusic	4/5 stars

The C.O.M.A. Imprint is a revision of Candiria's 1997 second album Beyond Reasonable Doubt, with remixed and re-recorded renditions of all that album's tracks, excluding "Lost in the Forest", "Mental Politics", and "Intrusive Statements", replacing them with the tracks "Peel This Strip and Fold Here", "Bring the Pain/Multiple Incisions", and "R-Evolutionize-R". Disc 2 contains tracks from some of the band members' side projects.

In 2016, Candiria supported Beyond Reasonable Doubt with a 20th anniversary tour.

== Track listing ==
=== Beyond Reasonable Doubt ===
1. "Faction" – 5:14
2. "Year One" – 4:55
3. "Lost in the Forest" – 8:06
4. "Paradigm Shift" – 4:25
5. "Tribes" – 5:55
6. "Molecular Dialect" – 2:37
7. "Divided" – 4:17
8. "Mental Politics" – 4:53
9. "Riding the Spiral" – 0:35
10. "Primary Obstacle" – 3:56
11. "Intrusive Statements" – 20:03

=== The C.O.M.A. Imprint ===
==== Disc one ====
1. "Paradigm Shift" – 4:25
2. "Year One" – 4:55
3. "Peel This Strip and Fold Here" – 4:19
4. "Faction" – 4:55
5. "Bring the Pain/Multiple Incisions" – 4:53
6. "Riding the Spiral" – 0:29
7. "Tribes" – 5:55
8. "Primary Obstacle" – 3:49
9. "Molecular Dialect" – 2:46
10. "Divided" – 4:17
11. "R-Evolutionize-R" – 9:30

==== Disc two ====
1. "Blue Suede Timbs" (Chief (8)) – 3:18
2. "Collective Unconscious" (The Moons Project) – 6:17
3. "That Which Survives" (Ghosts of the Canal) – 5:28
4. "Let the Mic Go" (Kid Gambino) – 3:12
5. "Hypnotic Oceans" (The Moons Project) – 4:45
6. "Richard Dreyfuss" (Ghosts of the Canal) – 6:14

== Personnel ==
- Carley Coma – vocals
- John Lamacchia – guitar
- Eric Matthews – guitar
- Michael MacIvor – bass
- Kenneth Schalk – drums, programming
