= Nancy A. Collins =

American novelist

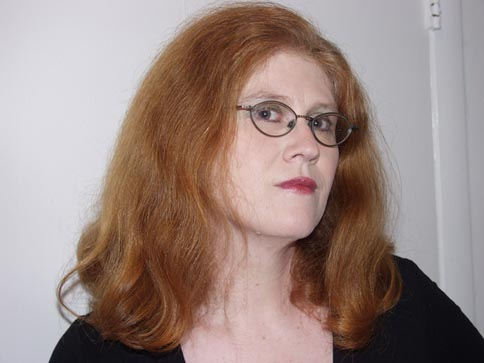
- Nancy A. Collins
- Born: September 10, 1959 (age 66); McGehee, Arkansas, U.S.
- Occupations: Novelist; short story writer
- Writing career
- Genres: Horror fiction; Fantasy; Science fiction

Nancy A. Collins (born September 10, 1959) is an American horror fiction writer best known for her series of vampire novels featuring her character Sonja Blue. Collins has also written for comic books, including the Swamp Thing (vol. 2) series, Jason vs. Leatherface, Predator: Hell Come A' Walkin' and her own one-shot issue Dhampire: Stillborn.

Collins was born in McGehee, Arkansas, United States. She lived in New Orleans, Louisiana in the 1980s; after time in New York City and Atlanta, Georgia she moved about the South for several years, living in coastal North Carolina and Virginia, before settling in Macon, Georgia in 2019.

== Writing ==
Collins has written numerous novels since 1989, most of which refer to and directly include races of creatures the author calls Pretenders, monsters from myth and legend passing as human to better hunt their prey. She is best known for Sonja Blue, a young woman with demonic powers who after being taught by an older male mentor, hunts and kills vampires. Her first appearance was in 1989. A. Asbjørn Jøn notes possible intertextual links between the Whistler character in the 1998 movie Blade and a character named Whistler in the Sonja Blue novel, A Dozen Black Roses (1996), as they possess "striking similarities in role, dramatic focus, visual appearance, and sharing the name". Margaret L. Carter, in her article on 20th century vampire fiction, listed Sunglasses After Dark as one of the 13 most influential vampire novels published after 1970, particularly in the way Collins depicted vampires as parasitic beings with no identity of their own who 'borrow' the memories of their hosts.

== Bibliography ==
=== Chapbooks ===
- The Tortuga Hill Gang's Last Ride: The True Story (1991)
- Cold Turkey (1992)
- Voodoo Chile (2002)
- The Thing From Lover's Lane (2003)

=== Non-fiction ===
- The Big Book of Losers (1996)
- Drawn Swords' - "Foreword" (2017)
- From Bayou To Abyss: Examining John Constantine, Hellblazer - "What Do You Do With An Undead Sailor?" (2020)
- REH Changed My Life - "REH: Opener of the Way" (2021)

== Comic books ==
- Swamp Thing (vol. 2) (DC/Vertigo, 1991–1993)
- Jason vs. Leatherface (Topps Comics, 1995)
- Sunglasses After Dark (Verotik Publications, 1995–1997)
- Machina Jones (Marvel Comics, 1995)
- Dhampire: Stillborn (Vertigo, 1996; DC Comics, 1997) ISBN 978-1-56389-256-1
- Predator: Hell Come A' Walkin' (Dark Horse, 1996)
- Vampirella (Dynamite, 2014–2016)
- Sunglasses After Dark: Full Blooded Edition (IDW, 2015)
- Army of Darkness: Furious Road (Dynamite Entertainment, 2016)
- Swamp Thing by Nancy A. Collins Omnibus (DC Comics/DC Black Label, 2020)

== Awards ==
Awards for Nancy Collins
Year	Award	Category	Work	Result	Ref.
1989	Bram Stoker Award	First Novel	Sunglasses After Dark	Won	
1990	Lord Ruthven Award	Fiction	Sunglasses After Dark	Won	
1990	British Fantasy Award	Sydney J. Bounds Award (Newcomer)		Won	
1990	Locus Award	First Novel	Sunglasses After Dark	Nominated	
1990	Locus Award	Horror	Sunglasses After Dark	Nominated	
1990	Astounding Award for Best New Writer		Sunglasses After Dark	Nominated	
1990	Compton Crook Award	First Novel	Sunglasses After Dark	Nominated	
1991	Locus Award	Horror/Dark Fantasy	Tempter	Nominated	
1992	Locus Award	Horror/Dark Fantasy	In the Blood	Nominated	
1992	Eisner Awards	Single Issue/One-Shot	Swamp Thing #113	Nominated	
1995	Locus Award	Horror/Dark Fantasy	Wild Blood	Nominated	
1995	Locus Award	Collection	Nameless Sins	Nominated	
1996	Locus Award	Horror/Dark Fantasy	Paint it Black	Nominated	
1996	Locus Award	Anthology	Dark Love	Nominated	
1996	World Fantasy Award	Anthology	Dark Love	Nominated	
1996	Bram Stoker Award	Long Fiction	The Thing from Lover's Lane	Nominated	
1996	Deathrealm Award	Anthology	Dark Love	Won	
1998	Seiun Award	Translated Long Work	Sunglasses After Dark	Nominated	
2002	International Horror Guild Award	Collection	Knuckles and Tales	Nominated	
2002	Bram Stoker Award	Fiction Collection	Knuckles and Tales	Nominated	

== Other ==
She is the founder of the International Horror Guild.

== See also ==
- List of horror fiction authors
