= Leshan, Suva Reka =

Leshan: Leshan (Albanian); Lešane (Serbian)
- Village
- Location in Kosovo
- Location: Kosovo
- District: Prizren
- Municipality: Suva Reka
- Elevation: 374 m (1,227 ft)

Population (2024)
  - Total: 1,306
- Time zone: UTC+1 (CET)
  - Summer (DST): UTC+2 (CEST)

Leshan (Serbian: Lešane Лешане) is a settlement in the Suva Reka municipality in south Kosovo. It is located in the Prizren region. It lies 374 m above sea level. It has an ethnic Albanian majority, and Serbian minority; in the 1991 census, it had 2381 inhabitants. The smaller settlement of Topliçan has been registered with Leshan in the censuses (The 1981 data shows only Leshan data). Leshan consists kf 200–250 houses and around 2800-2900 inhabitants.

Demographic history
Ethnic group	1948	1953	1961	1971	1981	1991
Albanians					1279	
Serbs					310	
Total	727	849	935	1303	1589	2381
