= Saga of the Noble Dead =

Book by Barb Hendee

- Author: Barb Hendee; J. C. Hendee
- Country: United States
- Language: English
- Genre: Fantasy, horror

Saga of the Noble Dead (also known as The Noble Dead Series), written by Barb Hendee and J. C. Hendee, wife and husband duo, is a set of chronological books in series, and chronological series in a saga that tells the story of protagonists drawn together in a struggle against the little-known and little believed-in Noble Dead (higher undead such as vampires) that herald the return of a long forgotten age in a fantasy world. It begins with an unlikely trio drawn together as charlatans who use their skills to cheat peasants by the common superstitions concerning the undead. They find that not all superstitions are completely false.

== Series ==
=== Series 1 ===
Composed of six novels, it tells the story of Magiere (a dhampir: a vampire/human hybrid), Leesil (a half-elf, an elf/human hybrid, with a dark past), and Chap (an elemental Fay born into the body of a majay-hì, elven hounds of a wolf lineage). In Series 1, Book 1, S1B2: Dhampir, Magiere is unaware of her inner nature, the discovery of which leads the trio into a tangled path that uncovers hints of the Forgotten History.

At the start of the story, the two "half-breeds", together with Chap, make a living pretending to be 'vampire-hunters'. They cross paths with genuine vampires, one form of the Noble Dead or highest form[s] of the undead. This leads to the protagonists being driven from home on a quest.

=== Series 2 ===
Comprising three novels, it centers on a new trio composed of two secondary characters from Series/Phase 1 and one new character: Wynn Hygeorht (the young journeyer "sage"), Chane Andraso (a "young" vampire obsessed with Wynn), and a two-year-old majay-hì named Shade (daughter of Chap, from series/phase 1, and Lily, a wild majay-hì female). This series also introduces to the second (spiritual) form of the three major forms of Noble Dead, the first being the vampire (physical) form as encountered previously. Book 1 of this series begins about a year after the end of Series/Phase 1 on a different continent in the city of Calm Seatt, royal city of the nation of Malournè and home to the founding branch of the Guild of Sagecraft.

Wynn has returned to her guild branch, escorted to the city limits by Magiere, Leesil, and Chap. On Wynn's arrival at guild, her documents and journals are seized, for the guild leaders do not want what they contain to become public knowledge. Wynn sets out to recover the texts and her journals in the hope of uncovering why a mythical war of a past age left humanity with an unknown Forgotten History. She does so under the protection of two who are innate enemies and have followed her from across the world: Chane Andraso, a vampire, and Shade, a very young majay-hì whose kind are known to hunt and eradicate the undead.

=== Series 3 ===
Wynn is reunited with Magiere and Leesil and Chap, and other old characters return as well.

== Novels ==
Noble Dead Saga

- Series/Phase 1
1. S1B1: Dhampir (2003, ISBN 0-451-45906-7)
2. S1B2: Thief of Lives (2004, ISBN 0-451-45953-9)
3. S1B3: Sister of the Dead (2005, ISBN 0-451-46009-X)
4. S1B4: Traitor to the Blood (2006, ISBN 0-451-46090-1)
5. S1B5: Rebel Fay (2007, ISBN 0-451-46143-6)
6. S1B6: Child of a Dead God (2008, ISBN 0-451-46221-1)
- Series/Phase 2
1. S2B1: In Shade and Shadow (2009, ISBN 0-451-46302-1)
2. S2B2: Through Stone and Sea (2010, ISBN 0-451-46318-8)
3. S2B3: Of Truth and Beasts (2011, ISBN 0-451-46402-8)
- Series/Phase 3
1. S3B1: Between Their Worlds (2012, ISBN 0-451-46435-4)
2. S3B2: The Dog in the Dark (2012, ISBN 978-0451464934)
3. S3B3: A Wind in the Night (2014, ISBN 978-0451465672)
4. S3B4: First and Last Sorcerer (2015, ISBN 978-0451469304)
5. S3B5: The Night Voice (2016, ISBN 978-0451469328)

Sidestories

Tales from the World of the Saga of the Noble Dead

- Homeward
  - Homeward (March 2014, ISBN 978-0615981307) by Barb Hendee — compendium edition containing "The Keepers", "The Reluctant Guardian", "Captives", "Claws", "The Sleeping Curse", "Silent Bells"
1. The Game Piece (April 2012, ISBN 978-0-9855616-0-4) by Barb Hendee
2. The Feral Path (June 2012, ISBN 978-0-9855616-2-8) by Barb Hendee
3. The Sapphire (July 2012, ISBN 978-0-9855616-3-5) by Barb Hendee
4. The Keepers (August 2012, ISBN 978-0-9855616-4-2) by Barb Hendee
  1. The Keepers
  2. Captives (April 2013, ISBN 9780985561680) by Barb Hendee — Sequel to "The Keepers"
  3. Claws (June 2013, ASIN B00D7P7KIU) by Barb Hendee — Sequel to "Captives"
  4. The Sleeping Curse (July 2013, ASIN B00DTJJSKC)
  5. Silent Bells (August 2013, ASIN B00DTJJSKC)
5. The Reluctant Guardian (September 2012, ISBN 978-0-9855616-5-9) by Barb Hendee
- Bones of the Earth
  - Nameless (February 2015, ASIN B00TFTB6XM) by J.C. Hendee — compendium edition containing "Karras the Kitten", "Karras the Cat", "Karras the Nameless"
1. Karras the Kitten (May 2012, ISBN 978-0-9855616-1-1) by J.C. Hendee
2. Karras the Cat (October 2012, ASIN B00A03F12Y) by J.C. Hendee
3. Karras the Nameless
- Tales of Misbelief
  - The Forgotten (2017, ASIN B06VWKWZQR) omnibus volume
1. The Forgotten Lord (February 2013, ISBN 9780985561673) by Barb Hendee
2. The Forgotten Mistress (September 2013, ASIN B00F8OL8Z4) by Barb Hendee
3. The Forgotten Village (June 2014, ASIN B00KV0RQA6) by Barb Hendee
4. The Forgotten Daughter by Barb Hendee
- Sagecraft
1. Puppy Love (June 2013, ASIN B00DGZ7HAM) by J.C. Hendee

Spin-offs

Codex of the Noble Dead (planned) by J.C. Hendee

- Mist Torn Witches series
1. The Mist-Torn Witches (May 2013, ISBN 978-0451414151) by Barb Hendee
2. The Witches in Red (May 6, 2014, ISBN 978-0451414168) by Barb Hendee
3. Witches with the Enemy (5 May 2015, ISBN 978-0451471338) by Barb Hendee
4. To Kill A Kettle Witch (May 2016, ISBN 978-0-451-47134-5) by Barb Hendee
- Dead Seekers series
1. The Dead Seekers (2017, ISBN 9780451469342) by Barb Hendee

== Characters ==
Magiere

A dhampir (half-human half-vampire), protagonist and primary character of the saga as a whole.

Leesil (Leshil)

A half-human half-Elf (an'Croan), protagonist and primary character of the saga as a whole.

Chap

A fay-hound (majay-hi), protagonist and primary character of the saga as a whole.

Wynn Hygeorht

A human scholar (sage) as an additional character of the first series/phase and a protagonist of the saga as a whole as of the second series/phase.

Welstiel Massing

A vampire, main antagonist of the first series/phase in the saga.

Chane Andraso

A vampire, antagonist in the first series and a main character in the second series/phase and beyond in the saga.

Shade

A fay-hound (majay-hi), a main character of the second series/phase and beyond in the saga.

Ore-Locks Iron-Braid

A dwarf, a main character of the second series/phase of the saga.
