= Jan L. Perkowski =

American academic

- Born: December 29, 1936
- Died: November 21, 2023 (aged 86)
- Occupation: Historian

Jan Louis Perkowski (December 29, 1936 - November 21, 2023) was a professor of Slavic Languages and Literatures at the University of Virginia.

== Biography ==
Perkowski was born in 1936 in Perth Amboy, New Jersey to John Perkowski and Veda Meyers Ferenchwich. He had three consecutive degrees, including a PhD in 1965 from Harvard University. Slavic languages, linguistics and folkore was the focus of his studies and research. Perkowski attracted attention when he published research into alleged vampire folklore in the 1970s that was easily sensationalized in the press and has a vogue among vampire fans.

Perkowski was a Teaching Fellow at Harvard from 1960 to 1963, and Assistant Professor at the Department of Foreign Languages at the University of California, Santa Barbara. He was Associate Professor at the Department of Slavic Languages and Literatures at the University of Texas, Austin from 1965 to 1974, and then Professor at the Department of Slavic Languages and Literatures at the University of Virginia from 1974 until his retirement in 2009. Over the course of his career, he held many other offices during different periods including: the founding member of the board of directors of the American Council of Teachers of Russian; chairman of the Russian Language Program Consortium of the Council for International Educational Exchange, the Fulbright Slavic and East European Studies Committee, the Department of Slavic Languages and Literatures at the University of Texas, the Department of Slavic Languages and Literatures at the University of Virginia, the University of Virginia Interdepartmental Program in General Linguistics, and Vice President of the Slavic and East European Folklore Association. He was also a member of the editorial board of Folia Slavica.

His publications include five books, more than 70 articles and 20 reviews.

Perkowski wrote about a Kashubian idiolect and was employed by the National Museum of Man in Canada in the late 1960s to conduct research for the Canadian Centre for Folk Culture Studies in the area of Wilno, Ontario, to study Kashubian Polish folklore and traditions. His 1972 report, Vampires, Dwarves, And Witches Among The Ontario Kashubs made national headlines and even reached the floor of the Canadian House of Commons. It provoked a reaction from residents who felt Perkowski embellished or fabricated his claims. Kashubians in Wilno, Ontario allegedly believe that "the only remedy against this kind of future vampirism was to extract the teeth from the infants. The Kashubs also feared those born with a red caul, a piece of amniotic membrane that naturally surrounds an unborn baby in the womb.

He resided in Charlottesville until his death in 2023, following complications from radiation therapy for prostate cancer.

== Publications ==
- 1969: A Kashubian Idiolect in the United States
- 1972: Vampires, Dwarves and Witches Among the Ontario Kashubs. Ottawa, Ontario, Canada : 1972
- 1976: Vampires of the Slavs. Cambridge, Massachusetts, USA : Slavica, 1976. ISBN 0-89357-026-5
- 1978: Gusle and Ganga Among the Hercegovinians of Toronto. Ann Arbor, Michigan, USA : University Microfilms International, 1978. ISBN 0-8357-0321-5
- 1982: "The Romanian Folkloric Vampire". East Europe Quarterly, September 1982. Reprinted in The Vampire: A Casebook, Alan Dundes, ed. (University of Wisconsin Press, 1998) ISBN 0-299-15924-8
- 1989: The Darkling: A Treatise on Slavic Vampirism. Columbus, Ohio, USA : Slavica, 1989. ISBN 0-89357-200-4
- 2000: Linguistic History Engraved in Gold and Silver: Legends on the Coins of St. Vladimir.
- 2006: Vampire Lore: From the Writings of Jan Louis Perkowski. Slavica, 2006. ISBN 0-89357-331-0
