= Barb Hendee =

American novelist

- Born: United States
- Occupation: Author
- Genre: Fantasy, horror
- Spouse: J. C. Hendee

Barb Hendee is an American fantasy author.

She is co-author with her husband J. C. Hendee of the Saga of the Noble Dead.

== Bibliography ==
=== Vampire Memories ===
1. Blood Memories (1999, ISBN 1-887038-06-X)
2. Hunting Memories (2009, ISBN 978-0-451-46291-6)
3. Memories of Envy (2010, ISBN 978-0-451-46353-1)
4. In Memories We Fear (2011, ISBN 978-0-451-46422-4)
5. Ghosts of Memories (2012, ISBN 978-0451464842)

Ghosts of Memories is the last volume in the Vampire Memories series.

=== Saga of the Noble Dead ===
Phase 1:

1. Dhampir (2003, ISBN 0-451-45906-7) with J. C. Hendee
2. Thief of Lives (2004, ISBN 0-451-45953-9) with J. C. Hendee
3. Sister of the Dead (2005, ISBN 0-451-46009-X) with J. C. Hendee
4. Traitor to the Blood (2006, ISBN 0-451-46066-9) with J. C. Hendee
5. Rebel Fay (2007, ISBN 978-0-451-46121-6) with J. C. Hendee
6. Child of a Dead God (2008, ISBN 978-0-451-46187-2) with J. C. Hendee

Phase 2:

1. In Shade and Shadow (2009, ISBN 978-0-451-46250-3) with J. C. Hendee
2. Through Stone and Sea (2010, ISBN 978-0-451-46312-8) with J. C. Hendee
3. Of Truth and Beasts (2011, ISBN 978-0-451-46375-3) with J. C. Hendee

Phase 3:

1. Between Their Worlds (2012, ISBN 978-0-451-46435-4) with J. C. Hendee
2. The Dog in the Dark (2012, ISBN 978-0-451-46493-4) with J. C. Hendee
3. A Wind in the Night (2014, ISBN 978-0451465672) with J. C. Hendee
4. First and Last Sorcerer (2015, ISBN 978-0-451-46931-1) with J. C. Hendee
5. The Night Voice (2016, ISBN 978-0-451-46932-8) with J. C. Hendee

Mist-Torn Witches:

1. The Mist-Torn Witches (May 7, 2013, ISBN 0-451-41415-2)
2. The Witches in Red (May 6, 2014, ISBN 978-0451414168)
3. Witches with the Enemy (May, 2015, ISBN 978-0-451-47133-8)
4. To Kill a Kettle Witch (May, 2016, ISBN 978-0-451-47134-5)

Dead Seekers:

1. The Dead Seekers (2017, ISBN 9780451469342)

Sidestories:

- Homeward
1. The Game Piece (April 2012, ISBN 978-0-9855616-0-4)
2. The Feral Path (June 2012, ISBN 978-0-9855616-2-8) by Barb Hendee
3. The Sapphire (July 2012, ISBN 978-0-9855616-3-5) by Barb Hendee
4. The Keepers (August 2012, ISBN 978-0-9855616-4-2) by Barb Hendee
  1. The Keepers
  2. Captives (April 2013, ISBN 9780985561680) by Barb Hendee and J.C. Hendee
  3. Claws (June 2013, ASIN B00D7P7KIU) by Barb Hendee and J.C. Hendee
  4. The Sleeping Curse (July 2013, ASIN B00DTJJSKC) by Barb Hendee and J.C. Hendee
  5. Silent Bells (August 2013, ASIN B00DTJJSKC) by Barb Hendee and J.C. Hendee
5. The Reluctant Guardian (September 2012, ISBN 978-0-9855616-5-9)
  - Homeward (March 2014, ISBN 978-0615981307) by Barb Hendee — compendium edition containing "The Keepers", "The Reluctant Guardian", "Captives", "Claws", "The Sleeping Curse", "Silent Bells"
- Tales of Misbelief

The Forgotten (2017, ASIN B06VWKWZQR) omnibus volume
1. The Forgotten Lord (February 2013, ISBN 9780985561673) by Barb Hendee and J.C. Hendee
2. The Forgotten Mistress (September 2013, ISBN B00F8OL8Z4) by Barb Hendee and J.C. Hendee
3. The Forgotten Village by Barb Hendee
4. The Forgotten Daughter by Barb Hendee

- Sagecraft
1. Puppy Love (June 2013, ASIN B00DGZ7HAM) by Barb Hendee and J.C. Hendee

=== Alone With ===
A series of romance novels

1. Alone with a Soldier (July 2016) ISBN 9781535596794
2. Alone with a Thief (October 2016) ISBN 1539371301

=== Dark Glass ===
A fantasy romance series

1. Through a Dark Glass (2018) ISBN 9781635730005
2. A Choice of Crowns (2018) ISBN 9781635730029
3. A Girl of White Winter (2018) ISBN 9781635730326
4. A Choice of Secrets (2018 ISBN 9781635730340

=== Hunter's Girl ===
1. The Hunters' Girl (2020) ISBN 9798647769091

=== Non-series novels ===
- Forgotten (2018) ISBN 9781543156881, a historical fantasy romance novel
