= 1792 in literature =

This article contains information about the literary events and publications of 1792.

== Events ==
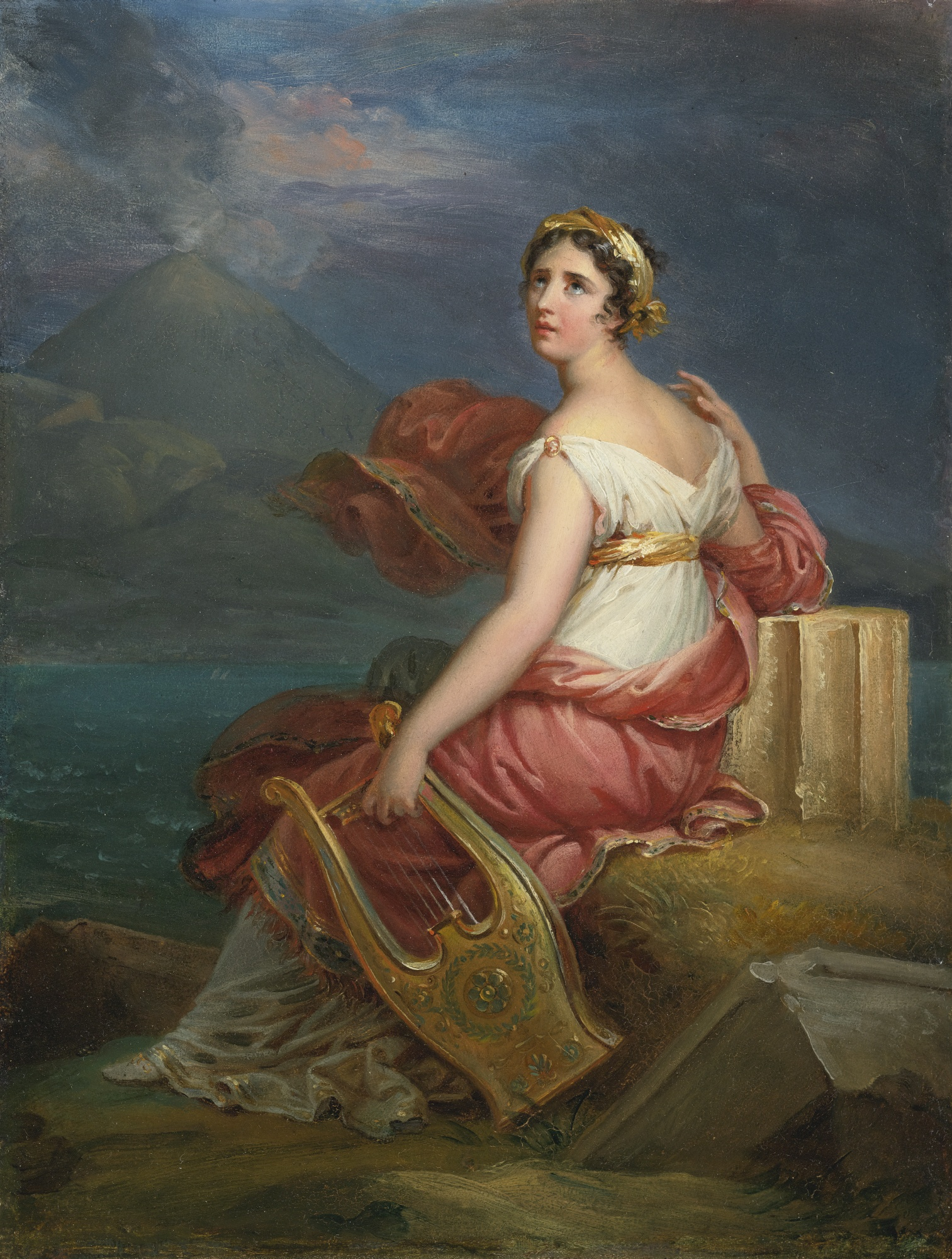
Germaine de Staël depicted as her character Corinne (posthumously) by François Gérard

- February 18 – Thomas Holcroft's the comedy The Road to Ruin is premièred at Covent Garden in London.
- July – Molière's body is exhumed for reburial in the Museum of French Monuments in Paris, having been originally buried in the ground reserved for unbaptised infants, because actors were not allowed to be buried on sacred ground.
- September 3 – Germaine de Staël flees from the French Revolution to Coppet Castle in Switzerland, where she forms a salon.
- September 29 – The Theatre Royal, Dumfries, opens as The Theatre. By the 21st century this will be the oldest working theatre in Scotland.
- unknown date – Henry Walton Smith and his wife Anna set up a newsagent's business in London that will become the bookselling chain WHSmith.

== New books ==
=== Fiction ===
- Hugh Henry Brackenridge – Modern Chivalry: containing the Adventures of Captain John Farrago and Teague O'Regan, his servant
- Johann Baptist Durach – Philippine Welserin
- Susannah Gunning – Anecdotes of the Delborough Family
- Thomas Holcroft – Anna St. Ives
- Cornelia Knight – Marcus Flaminius
- Charlotte Palmer
  - It Is and It Is Not a Novel
  - Integrity and Content: an Allegory
- Mary Robinson – Vancenza; or The Dangers of Credulity
- Charlotte Turner Smith – Desmond

=== Children ===
- Elizabeth Pinchard – The Blind Child, or, Anecdotes of the Wyndham Family

=== Drama ===
- Pierre Beaumarchais – La Mère coupable
- Joseph Chénier – Caïus Gracchus
- Leandro Fernández de Moratín – La comedia nueva
- Thomas Holcroft – The Road to Ruin
- Elizabeth Inchbald – Cross Partners
- William Macready the Elder – The Irishman in London
- Thomas Morton – Columbus

=== Poetry ===
- Samuel Rogers – The Pleasures of Memory, with Other Poems

=== Non-fiction ===
- Saul Ascher – Leviathan oder über Religion in Rücksicht des Judentums (Leviathan or religion in respect of Judaism)
- Yuan Mei (袁枚) – Suiyuan shidan (Recipes from the Garden of Contentment)
- Arthur Murphy – An Essay on the Life and Genius of Samuel Johnson
- Maria Riddell – Voyage to the Madeira and Leeward and Caribbean Isles, with Sketches of the Natural History of these Islands
- Gottlob Ernst Schulze – Aenesidemus
- Mary Wollstonecraft – A Vindication of the Rights of Woman

== Births ==
- February 10 – Frederick Marryat (Captain Marryat), English novelist and naval officer (died 1848)
- April 5 – John Lavicount Anderdon, English writer (died 1874)
- April 25 – John Keble, English poet (died 1866)
- June 21 – Ferdinand Christian Baur, German theologian (died 1860)
- July 2 – Thomas Phillipps, English book collector (died 1872)
- August 4 – Percy Bysshe Shelley, English poet and radical (died 1822)
- October 17 – Sir John Bowring, English political economist and miscellanist (died 1872)
- October 20 – John Pascoe Fawkner, pioneer, newspaper publisher in Melbourne, Victoria, Australia (died 1869)
- October 28 – Anne Knight (Anne Waspe), English children's writer and educationist (died 1860)
- November 26 – Sarah Grimké, American abolitionist and suffragist (died 1873)
- November 28 – Victor Cousin, French philosopher (died 1867)
- December 18 – William Howitt, English historical writer and poet (died 1879)

== Deaths ==
- April 23 – Karl Friedrich Bahrdt, German theologian and writer (born 1741)
- May 4 – Giuseppe Garampi, Italian scholar and book collector (born 1725)
- May 12 – Charles Simon Favart, French dramatist (born 1710)
- May 29 – Thomas Marryat, English medical writer and physician (born 1730)
- June 4
  - John Burgoyne, English dramatist and army officer (born 1723)
  - Jakob Michael Reinhold Lenz, Baltic German dramatist (born 1751) (found dead early this morning, May 24 in the Julian calendar)
- September 25 – Jacques Cazotte, French novelist (born 1719) (executed)
- September – John Edwards (1747–1792), Welsh poet (born 1747)
- December 7 – Marie Jeanne Riccoboni (Laboras de Mezières), French novelist (born 1714)
