= 1833 in literature =

This article contains information about the literary events and publications of 1833.

== Events ==
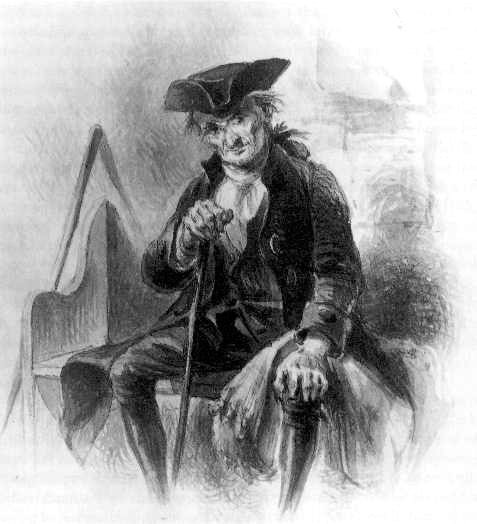
Diedrich Knickerbocker, the eponymous character created by Washington Irving.

- January
  - The Knickerbocker is established by Charles Fenno Hoffman as The Knickerbacker: or, New-York monthly magazine. Hoffman was the founding editor of The Knickerbocker in 1833, though he helmed only three issues. Hoffman turned the magazine over to Timothy Flint, who changed the original name The Knickerbacker to The Knickerbocker. Flint then sold the magazine to Lewis Gaylord Clark, who bought it in April 1834 and served as its editor until 1861. By 1840, The Knickerbocker was the most influential literary publication of its time.
  - Alphonse de Lamartine is elected a député of France.
- c. January – The publisher Richard Bentley issues the first collected edition of Jane Austen's novels. In 1832, Bentley purchased the remaining copyrights to all of Austen's novels. Over the following winter, Bentley published five illustrated volumes as part of his Standard Novels series. In October 1833, Bentley released the first collected edition of her works. Since then, Austen's novels have been continuously in print.
- February 16 – Victor Hugo and the actress Juliette Drouet begin a fifty-year affair. Drouet's last stage role was that of Lady Jane Grey in Hugo's Marie Tudor in 1833, after which she abandoned her theatrical career and dedicated the remainder of her life to her lover. She became Hugo's secretary and traveling companion. For many years, she lived a cloistered life, leaving home only in his company. In 1852, she accompanied him in his exile on Jersey, and then in 1855 on Guernsey. She wrote thousands of letters to him throughout her life, which testify to her writing talent according to Henri Troyat, who wrote her biography in 1997. Each year, from 16 February 1834 to 1883, the couple celebrated the anniversary of the first night which they had spent together. Hugo even slipped this personal anecdote into the plot of his novel Les Misérables (1862): Marius Pontmercy and Cosette’s wedding night takes place on the same date.
- March 16 – Parley's Magazine, an American periodical for young readers, publishes its first issue in Boston.
- March 25 – Edmund Kean, playing Othello to the Iago of his son, Charles Kean, collapses on the stage of the Theatre Royal, Covent Garden, London, and dies two months later.
- June 10 – The Dramatic Authors Act passed in the United Kingdom grants playwrights copyright in their work.
- Summer – George Sand and Alfred de Musset begin a two-year affair, recorded in their respective novels Elle et lui (1859) and La Confession d'un Enfant du Siècle (1836).
- September 15 – The English poet Arthur Henry Hallam, a close friend of Tennyson and engaged to be married to his sister Emily, dies suddenly of a brain haemorrhage in Vienna aged 22. This year in his memory Tennyson writes "Ulysses" (completed October 20; published in Poems of 1842), "Tithon" (an early version of "Tithonus") and "The Two Voices" (originally entitled "Thoughts of a Suicide"). He begins "Morte d'Arthur" (published 1842) and "Tiresias" (published 1885). In 1850 he will publish In Memoriam A.H.H.
- October 3 – The Anglo-Irish actress Harriet Smithson marries the French composer Hector Berlioz in a civil ceremony at the British Embassy in Paris.
- December 1 – Charles Dickens' first published work of fiction, "A Dinner at Poplar Walk", is the first item in what will become Sketches by Boz. It appears unsigned in the Monthly Magazine (London).
- unknown dates
  - Publication begins in England of The Penny Cyclopædia of the Society for the Diffusion of Useful Knowledge, edited by George Long.
  - The first of the Bridgewater Treatises, examining science in relation to God, is published in England.
  - The first complete German translation of Shakespeare's plays appears: Shakespeares Dramatische Werke, by Karl Wilhelm Friedrich Schlegel, Ludwig Tieck and his daughter Dorothea, and Wolf Heinrich Graf von Baudissin.
  - Mrs Favell Lee Mortimer's instructional text The Peep of Day, or, A series of the earliest religious instruction the infant mind is capable of receiving appears in England. It will sell a million copies in 38 languages.
  - The first printing press in Jerusalem is set up in the Armenian Quarter.

== New books ==
=== Fiction ===
- Honoré de Balzac
  - Ferragus
  - Le Médecin de campagne (The Country Doctor)
- Edward Bulwer – Godolphin
- Thomas Carlyle – Sartor Resartus (first book publication)
- Massimo D'Azeglio – Ettore Fieramosca
- Benjamin Disraeli – Alroy
- Cornelia Knight – Sir Guy de Lusignan
- Henry Wadsworth Longfellow – Outre-Mer
- Alfred de Musset (attributed) – Gamiani, ou deux nuits d'excès (Gamiani, or Two Nights of Excess)
- John Neal — The Down-Easters, &c. &c. &c.
- Aleksandr Pushkin – Eugene Onegin («Евге́ний Оне́гин», verse novel, first complete book publication)
- George Sand
  - Andréa
  - Jacques
  - Kouroglou / Épopée Persane
  - Lelia
  - Leone Leoni
  - Mattéa
- Michael Scott – Tom Cringle's Log

=== Children and young people ===
- Agnes Strickland – Historical Tales of Illustrious British Children

=== Drama ===
- Joseph Freiherr von Eichendorff – The Wooers
- Aleksander Fredro – Maidens' Vows, or the Magnetism of the Heart (Śluby panieńskie, czyli magnetyzm serca)
- Aleksander Griboyedov – Woe from Wit («Горе от ума», published posthumously with cuts)
- Victor Hugo
  - Lucrezia Borgia
  - Marie Tudor
- James Sheridan Knowles – The Wife
- Johann Nestroy – Lumpaziva gabundus
- Eugène Scribe – Bertrand et Raton, ou l'art de conspirer

=== Poetry ===
- Robert Browning – Pauline
- Hartley Coleridge – Poems, songs and sonnets
- Wilhelm Hey (anonymously) – Fünfzig Fabeln für Kinder (Fifty Fables for Children)
- Alfred Tennyson – Poems (including "The Lady of Shalott", 1st version)
- See also 1833 in poetry

=== Non-fiction ===
- Franz Bopp – Vergleichende Grammatik des Sanskrit, Zend, Griechischen, Lateinischen, Litthauischen, Altslawischen, Gotischen und Deutschen (Comparative Grammar of Sanskrit, Zend (Avestan), Greek, Latin, Lithuanian, Old Slavonic, Gothic and German, first part)
- Lydia Maria Child – An Appeal in Favor of that Class of Americans Called Africans
- Godfrey Higgins – Anacalypsis
- Charles Lamb – Last Essays of Elia
- Webster's Revision of the Bible

== Births ==
- January 15 – Alexandru Papadopol-Calimah, Moldavian and Romanian historian, memoirist, and journalist (died 1898)
- January 23 – Lewis Morris, Anglo-Welsh poet (died 1907)
- May 27 – Hester Martha Poole, American writer, poet, and art critic (died 1932)
- June 19 – Mary Tenney Gray, American editorial writer, club-woman, philanthropist, and suffragette (died 1904)
- July 9 – Florence Marryat, English novelist and entertainer (died 1899)
- August 9 – Emily Pepys, English child diarist (died 1877)
- August 12 – Lillie Devereux Blake, American writer and reformer (died 1913)
- August 20 – Vasile Pogor, Romanian poet, scholar and politician (died 1906)
- October 19 – Adam Lindsay Gordon, Australian poet, jockey and politician (died 1870)
- October 8 – Edmund Clarence Stedman, American poet and critic (died 1908)
- October 21 – Alfred Nobel, Swedish inventor and entrepreneur, creator of the Nobel Prize (died 1896)
- November 2 – Horace Howard Furness, American Shakespearean scholar (died 1912)
- November 6 – Jonas Lie, Norwegian writer (died 1908)
- November 9 – Émile Gaboriau, French writer (died 1873)
- November 22 – Martha Haines Butt, American novelist (died 1871)
- December 27 – Larin Paraske, Izhorian oral poet (died 1904)

== Deaths ==
- January 14 – Gottlob Ernst Schulze, German philosopher (born 1761)
- February 3 – Nikolay Gnedich, Russian poet and translator (born 1784)
- February 4 – John O'Keeffe, Irish dramatist (born 1747)
- March 7 – Rahel Varnhagen, German literary hostess (born 1771)
- March 11 – Franz Passow, German classicist and lexicographer (born 1786)
- April 13 – Elisa von der Recke, German poet (born 1754)
- May 10 – François Andrieux, French man of letters and dramatist (born 1759)
- May 15 – Edmund Kean, English Shakespearean actor (born 1787)
- August 25 – Jean-Louis Laya, French dramatist (born 1761)
- September 7 – Hannah More, English religious writer and philanthropist (born 1745)
- September 15 – Arthur Hallam, English poet (born 1811)
- October 4 – Maria Jane Jewsbury (Fletcher), English writer, poet and reviewer, dies in India (born 1800)

== Sources ==
- Gilson, David. "Editions and Publishing History". The Jane Austen Companion. Ed. J. David Grey. New York: Macmillan, 1986. ISBN 0-02-545540-0. 135–139
- Gilson, David. "Letter publishing history". Jane Austen in Context. Ed. Janet Todd. Cambridge: Cambridge University Press, 2005. ISBN 0-521-82644-6. 121–159
- Southam, B.C. "Juvenilia". The Jane Austen Companion. Ed. J. David Grey. New York: Macmillan, 1986. ISBN 0-02-545540-0. 244–255
