= Elizabeth Heard =

English stage actress

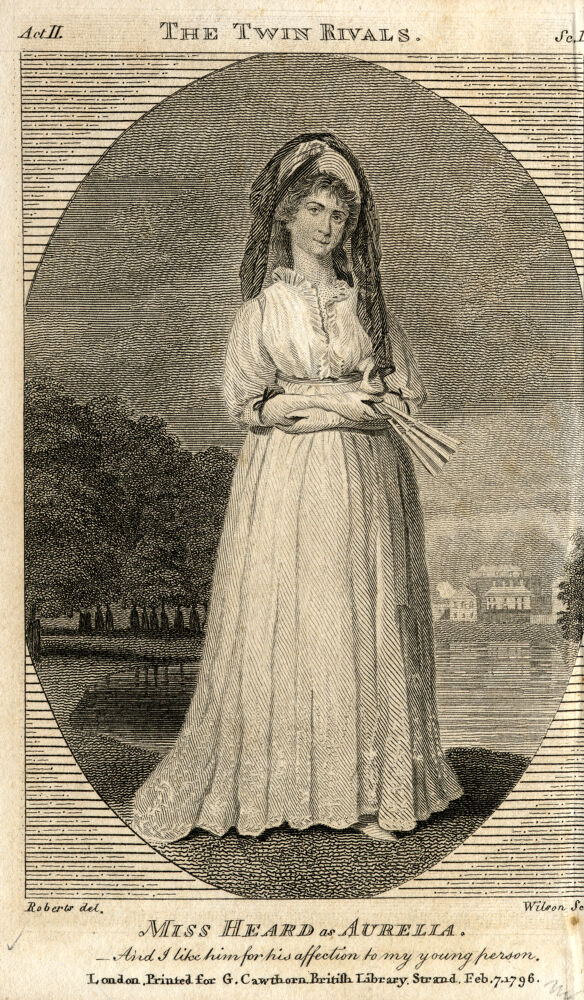
As Aurelia in The Twin Rivals, 1796.

Elizabeth Heard (born c.1775) was an English stage actress. She was born in London the daughter of William Heard, a physician and playwright, and his wife Ann Heard, an actress. Elizabeth made her stage debut at the Theatre Royal, Drury Lane as a child actor in 1782, where he mother was employed. She often played young male roles such as the Duke of York in Richard III and Prince Arthur in King John. As well as appearing as a member of the company at Drury Lane, she also began summer stints at the Haymarket from 1789 gradually playing more mature and important roles. In 1801 she left the Drury Lane company and later acted in Newcastle.

== Selected roles ==
- Laura in The Family Party by George Colman the Younger (1782)
- Lady Bridget Squander in Next Door Neighbours by Elizabeth Inchbald (1791)
- Louisa Fairfax in Cross Partners by Elizabeth Inchbald (1792)
- Dian in The London Hermit by John O'Keeffe (1793)
- Lucy in False Colours by Edward Morris (1793)
- Hannah in The Wedding Day by Elizabeth Inchbald (1794)
- Attendant in Vortigern and Rowena by William Henry Ireland (1796)
- Abra in Almeyda, Queen of Granada by Sophia Lee (1796)
- Violante in The Inquisitor by Thomas Holcroft (1798)
- Antonia in Aurelio and Miranda by James Boaden (1798)
- Teresa in The Castle of Montval by Thomas Sedgwick Whalley (1799)
- Countess Freberg in De Monfort by Joanna Baillie (1800)
- Emma in Adelaide by Henry James Pye (1800)

== Bibliography ==
- Highfill, Philip H., Burnim, Kalman A. & Langhans Edward A. A Biographical Dictionary of Actors, Volume 7, Habgood to Houbert: Actresses, Musicians, Dancers, Managers, and Other Stage Personnel in London, 1660-1800. SIU Press, 1982.
