= Sir Guy de Lusignan =

1833 novel

- Author: Cornelia Knight
- Language: English
- Genre: Historical
- Publisher: Saunders and Otley
- Publication date: 1833
- Publication place: United Kingdom
- Media type: Print

Sir Guy de Lusignan is an 1833 historical novel written by the British author Cornelia Knight. It was the final major work of the novelist best known for her 1792 novel Marcus Flaminius. It is set during Lord Edward's crusade to the Holy Land, led by the future Edward I of England.

== Bibliography ==
- Baker, Ernest Albert. The History of the English Novel, Volume 10. Rowman & Littlefield, 1934.
- Looser, Devoney. Women Writers and Old Age in Great Britain, 1750–1850. JHU Press, 2008.
- Lutrell, Barbara. The Prim Romantic: A Biography of Ellis Cornelia Knight, 1758–1837. Chatto & Windus, 1965/
- Murray, Alan V. The Crusades: An Encyclopedia. Bloomsbury Academic, 2006.
