= Tit for Tat (play) =

1786 play

- Original language: English
- Written by: George Colman the Elder
- Genre: Comedy
- Setting: England, present day

Premiere
- Date: 29 August 1786
- Place: Theatre Royal, Haymarket, London

Tit for Tat is a 1786 comedy play by the British writer George Colman the Elder. It premiered at the Theatre Royal, Haymarket in London on 29 August 1786. The original Haymarket cast included John Palmer as Villamour, Cockran Joseph Booth as Old Meanwell, William Davies as Young Meanwell, Robert Palmer as Skipwell, Elizabeth Farren as Florinda and Mary Bulkley as Letty. The Irish premiere took place at the Smock Alley Theatre in Dublin on 26 February 1787 It also subsequently appeared at both the Covent Garden and Theatre Royal, Drury Lane theatres.

== Bibliography ==
- Greene, John C. Theatre in Dublin, 1745-1820: A Calendar of Performances, Volume 6. Lexington Books, 2011.
- Nicoll, Allardyce. A History of English Drama 1660–1900: Volume III. Cambridge University Press, 2009.
- Hogan, C.B (ed.) The London Stage, 1660–1800: Volume V. Southern Illinois University Press, 1968.
