= Garrick Club =

Private members' club in London

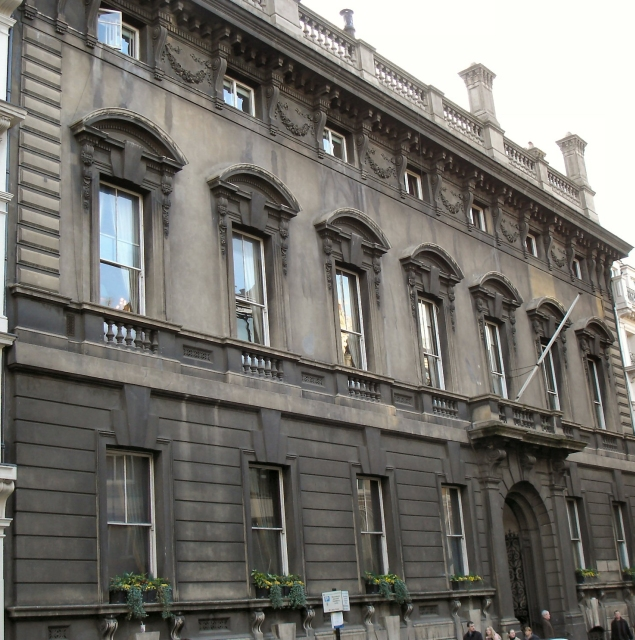
- Named after: David Garrick
- Formation: 1831 (195 years ago)
- Founders: James Winston; Samuel James Arnold; Samuel Beazley; General Sir Andrew Barnard
- Founded at: Theatre Royal, Drury Lane, London
- Type: Private members' club (exclusively a gentleman's club until May 2024)
- Location: 15 Garrick Street, London
- Coordinates: 51.511488°N 0.126327°W
- Members: 1,500
- Official language: English
- Affiliations: The arts, especially theatre
- Website: www.garrickclub.co.uk

The Garrick Club is a private members' club in London, founded in 1831 as a club for "actors and men of refinement to meet on equal terms". Its 1,500 members include many actors, writers, journalists, leading arts practitioners, at least 10 serving members of parliament (MPs) and dozens of members of the House of Lords, many heads of public institutions alongside businessmen, and at least 160 senior legal professionals and members of the judiciary including King's Counsel (KCs), Supreme Court and Court of Appeals judges. For most of its history, the Garrick was a gentlemen's club with membership customarily restricted to men. However, in May 2024 club members voted to acknowledge that existing rules had never explicitly excluded women as members and that there was no impediment to their election.

New candidates must be proposed by an existing member and seconded by another member, before supporting signatures are collected from at least 30 other members. The candidate then goes in front of a series of committees followed by a secret vote on membership. According to the club website, the original assurance of the committee is "that it would be better that ten unobjectionable men should be excluded than one terrible bore should be admitted".

The exclusion of women from membership generated disagreement within the club and criticism from wider society, especially as many figures were seen as members of the British establishment, or cultural elite; this criticism increased after a membership list was published in March 2024. In May 2024, the club voted to accept women as members for the first time.

== History ==
The Garrick Club was founded at a meeting in the Committee Room at Theatre Royal, Drury Lane, on Wednesday 17 August 1831. Present were James Winston (a former strolling player, manager and important theatre antiquarian), Samuel James Arnold (a playwright and theatre manager), Samuel Beazley (an architect and playwright), General Sir Andrew Barnard (an army officer from Ulster and a hero of the Napoleonic Wars), and Francis Mills (a timber merchant and railway speculator). It was decided to write down a number of names in order to invite them to be original members of the Garrick Club.

The avowed purpose of the club was to "tend to the regeneration of the Drama". It was to be a place where "actors and men of refinement could meet on equal terms" at a time when actors were not generally considered to be respectable members of society.

The club was named in honour of the actor David Garrick, whose acting and management at the Theatre Royal, Drury Lane, in the previous century had by the 1830s come to represent a golden age of British drama. Less than six months later the members had been recruited and a club house found and equipped on King Street in Covent Garden. On 1 February 1832, it was reported that the novelist and journalist Thomas Gaspey was the first member to enter at 11am, and that "Mr Beazley gave the first order, (a mutton chop) at 1/2 past 12."

The list of those who took up original membership includes actors such as John Braham, Charles Kemble, William Macready, Charles Mathews and his son Charles James; the playwrights James Planché, Theodore Hook and Thomas Talfourd; scene-painters including Clarkson Frederick Stanfield and Thomas Grieve. Even the patron, the Duke of Sussex, had an element of the theatrical about him, being a well-known mesmerist. To this can be added numerous Barons, Counts, Dukes, Earls and Lords, soldiers, parliamentarians and judges.

The membership would later include Charles Kean, Sir Henry Irving, Sir Herbert Beerbohm Tree, Sir Arthur Sullivan, Sir James M. Barrie, Sir Arthur Wing Pinero, Lord Olivier and Sir John Gielgud. From the literary world came writers such as Charles Dickens, William Makepeace Thackeray, Anthony Trollope, H. G. Wells, A. A. Milne (who on his death in 1956 bequeathed the club a quarter of the royalties from his children's books), and Kingsley Amis. The visual arts has been represented by painters such as John Everett Millais, Lord Leighton and Dante Gabriel Rossetti.

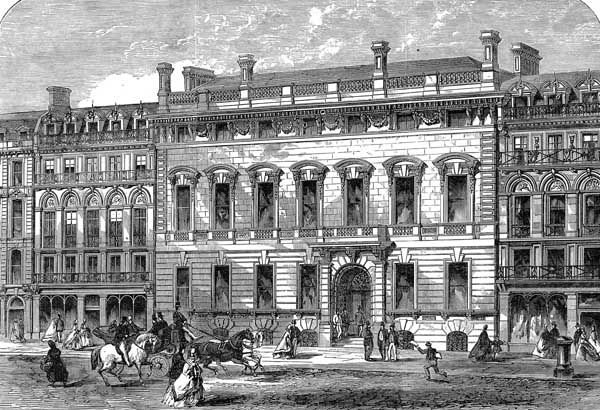
The club in 1864

The club's popularity at the beginning of the 1860s created overcrowding of its original clubhouse. Slum clearance being undertaken just round the corner provided the opportunity to move into a brand-new purpose-built home on what became known as Garrick Street. The move was completed in 1864 and the club remains in this building today.

All new candidates must be proposed by an existing member before election in a secret ballot, the original assurance of the committee being "that it would be better that ten unobjectionable men should be excluded than one terrible bore should be admitted". This exclusive nature of the club was highlighted when reporter Jeremy Paxman applied to join but was initially blackballed, though he was later admitted, an experience he shares with Sir Henry Irving who, despite being the first actor to receive a knighthood, had himself been blackballed in 1873. Bernard Levin was blackballed by members who were upset by a column he had written about Lord Chief Justice Goddard after Goddard's death.

When the club was founded in 1831, rule 1 of the Garrick Club Rules and Regulations called for the "formation of a theatrical Library, with works on costume". At a general meeting on 15 October 1831, the barrister John Adolphus suggested that members should present their duplicate dramatic works to the club, and that these should go some way towards forming a Library. A very valuable collection has thus come together over the years, and its special collections are particularly strong on 18th- and 19th-century theatre. The novelist William Makepeace Thackeray would frequently draw members of the club who he found amusing.

In 1985, Prince Charles was proposed by his father, Prince Philip, and seconded by the actor Donald Sinden. Charles described his profession as "self-employed" on the nomination form.

James Winston, the first secretary and librarian of the club, was one of the principal early benefactors and his gifts included minutes from the Theatre Royal, Drury Lane, as well as his own Theatric Tourist. These presentations formed the nucleus of a Library which now holds well over 10,000 items, including plays, manuscripts, prints (bound into numerous extra-illustrated volumes), and many photographs.

In 1933 a 21-year-old kitchen maid at the club stabbed a 33-year-old fish cook at the club in a dispute about working conditions. She was subsequently remanded for a medical report at the Bow Street Police Court. The evidence presented to the court by a witness included a large chopping knife and a letter complaining about her working conditions.

In 1956, the rights to A. A. Milne's Winnie-the-Pooh books were left to four beneficiaries: his family, the Royal Literary Fund, Westminster School and the Garrick Club.

A 1960 dinner at the club hosted by Eugen Millington-Drake brought together British and German survivors of the Battle of the River Plate. In January 1961 the Soviet naval attaché and spy Yevgeny Ivanov was introduced to osteopath Stephen Ward at the club by Colin Coote, the editor of the Daily Telegraph, which would lead to the subsequent Profumo affair.

The broadcaster Malcolm Muggeridge resigned from the club in 1964 after being asked for a transcript of an American television interview in which he had criticised the British royal family. A committee member of the club, journalist Joseph C. Harsch, inquired whether "the propriety for a member of the club for speaking against the royal family" might be considered by the club committee. Muggeridge said it was "preposterous ... that the committee of a club like the Garrick should consider themselves entitled to adjudicate upon the propriety or otherwise of what a member may choose to say in public".

== Membership ==
=== Membership process ===
Whilst details of the official membership process are not publicly available, various aspects of the process are known through news stories and the accounts of past or present members. Typically, an existing member is required to initially propose the name of a prospective new member, with another member required to second this proposal. The name of the proposed new member is then "put up" or "posted" in a membership list book. Enough members must sign in support of membership before membership will be formally considered. Should enough members have signed in support, the name of the prospective member has to go before the Candidates Committee. Only then, to progress from there, is someone considered by a reportedly 24-member General Committee. In between those two stages, a prospective member will be invited to attend so that members of the more senior committee can judge him.

Although prices are not publicly available, in March 2024 the cost of an annual membership was around £1,600. In 2011, the waiting list for membership was reported as being up to five years long.

=== Membership list ===
The identity of some club members, both past and present, has been widely known and reported in the press, with some individuals publicly identifying themselves as members. Since the Garrick's inception however, the club had always kept details of the full membership a closely guarded secret. In March 2024, The Guardian newspaper reported having access to the full "50 page membership book" (current as at the end of 2023) and started reporting on the identities of "about 1,500" all-male members, many of them senior members of the establishment including individuals from royalty, politics, the legal profession, the media and the arts.

==== Politicians ====
Reportedly, the Garrick has fewer politicians as members compared with 20 years ago; however, the membership list reveals dozens of members of the House of Lords and 10 serving members of Parliament (MPs) and remains a significant hub for senior legal professionals and Whitehall leaders. The majority of serving politicians are members of the Conservative Party; these include the former deputy prime minister, Oliver Dowden, the former levelling-up secretary, Michael Gove, Gove's levelling up department colleague Simon Hoare, the former minister of state for Brexit opportunities Jacob Rees-Mogg, the former justice secretary Robert Buckland (later chair of the Northern Ireland select committee), Daniel Hannan, a member of the House of Lords and then adviser to the Board of Trade and Kwasi Kwarteng who was elected as a member days before he was appointed as chancellor of the exchequer.

Also within the political sphere or as heads of public or political institutions are Robert Chote, once the head of the UK Statistics Authority, who was chair of the Office for Budget Responsibility from 2010 until 2020, David Willetts, then president of the British think tank, the Resolution Foundation (chiefly focused on issues of inequality) and Dean Godson, then director of the Policy Exchange, a right-wing think tank, former Post Office chair Tim Parker and the then chair of the Independent Press Standards Organisation, Edward Faulks. Following the Guardian reports, Simon Case, the cabinet secretary and the prime minister's most senior policy adviser and the leader of nearly half a million civil servants, and Richard Moore, the head of the Secret Intelligence Service (MI6), announced their resignations from the club on 20 March 2024. Case rejoined six months later.

==== Judiciary and legal professionals ====
From the legal profession, The Guardian reported that membership included a Supreme Court judge, five Court of Appeal judges, eight High Court judges, and about 150 KCs. The membership of significant numbers of senior legal professionals and the mixed messages this may send have been previously noted. Baroness Hale, as the then president of the Supreme Court, protested about the club's continued exclusion of women and the acquiescence of its members in that policy. She argued that judges "should be committed to the principle of equality for all". After a vote extending the ban on female members, Dinah Rose, a leading barrister specialising in human rights and public law, urged leading legal professionals including members of the Supreme Court, to "reconsider" their membership in the club.

==== The arts ====
Originally established so that "actors and men of refinement and education might meet on equal terms", and named after the 18th-century actor and theatre manager David Garrick, the Garrick Club continues to be patronised by members of the arts. The membership includes the actors Brian Cox and Matthew Macfadyen, both of whom starred in the Succession TV series, Hugh Bonneville, Hugh Laurie, Stephen Fry, Benedict Cumberbatch, David Suchet, and Damian Lewis. From opera, ballet and theatre, members include Christopher Rodrigues, the chair of the Royal Ballet School, John Gilhooly, the artistic director of Wigmore Hall, Harry Brünjes, the chair of the English National Opera, Alex Beard, the chief executive of the Royal Opera House, and Antonio Pappano, chief conductor of the London Symphony Orchestra.

==== Business ====
From the business world, members include Crispin Odey, the hedge fund manager and founder of Odey Asset Management that has had to close following an investigation report documenting the alleged sexual harassment and assault of 13 different women; Nigel Newton, chief executive and founder of the publisher Bloomsbury, best known for publishing the Harry Potter series; Peter Straus, the literary agent; Rocco Forte, the British hotelier and chairman of Rocco Forte Hotels; and Paul Smith, the fashion designer and owner of the eponymous brand.

=== Members of the press ===
Members of the press include Paul Dacre, the journalist editor-in-chief of the DMG Group, the publisher of the Daily Mail among other publications, John Simpson, the BBC's world affairs correspondent, and Sir Simon Jenkins, former editor of The Times.

=== Royalty, clergy and orders and titles ===
The Guardian reported King Charles III being a member, and about 150 members had included the title 'Sir' and 40 members listing themselves as 'Lord' as part of their name. The membership list also includes at least 90 members who have been appointed CBEs (Commander of the Order of the British Empire), 96 members appointed OBEs (Officer of the Order of the British Empire) and 9 members have been appointed KCMGs (Knights Commander of the Order of St Michael and St George). Such awards have been granted for service including acting as ambassadors to Moscow, Rome and Washington, senior roles at the North Atlantic Treaty Organization (NATO), the United Nations, the Foreign Office and the European Commission. The list also includes three bishops (two retired and one serving) and 14 priests.

== Women members ==
=== Current status ===
Until May 2024, the club rules were assumed to exclude the election of female candidates, referring as they did exclusively to 'gentlemen' members. Several past attempts to open the club to women members had failed. The most recent in-person poll on the membership of women in 2015 showed a very slim majority (50.5%) voted to admit women members, but "the club requires a two-thirds majority before rules can be changed". In 2023, a mail-in poll was conducted on membership but on attitudes towards admitting women. Of those members who participated, 51% indicated that they were in favour of admitting women, while 44% were opposed (as a percentage of the membership as a whole just 39% were in favour of change) but as with the previous poll, the club needed a two-thirds majority to trigger a rule change. However, in May 2024 the club voted to accept a legal opinion commissioned by four members from Lord Pannick to the effect that the existing rules, where they used the word 'he', should be construed as also meaning 'she' and that therefore, on this basis, no rule change was needed. The vote to accept this opinion required only a simple majority of those present physically and virtually at an extraordinary general meeting, rather than the two-thirds majority that a rule change would have required.

Later in 2024, Judi Dench and Siân Phillips became the first female members of the club.

In 2026, Queen Camilla became the first female member of the British royal family to be a member of the club.

=== History of the campaign for female membership ===
==== Equality Act 2010 and changes to allow female guests of members ====
From 1831 up until 2010, women were permitted only as guests of members, and not allowed to sit at the Centre Table which was reserved for members and their male guests Actress Joanna Lumley begins her biggest battle – joining the men-only Garrick Club. In Autumn 2010, however, the Garrick Club management wrote to members informing them that women guests (of members) were no longer banned from sitting at the centre table of its Coffee Room. For the first time in the club's history, women would also now be allowed to visit the cocktail bar before 9 o'clock in the evening and venture "under the stairs", an area hitherto reserved for members.

Allowing women to sit at the centre table as guests of members just as male guests of members were permitted was largely in response to the Equality Act 2010, which was introduced by the former Labour minister Harriet Harman. Jonathan Acton Davis who was at the time the Garrick's chairman, said this act meant that "each of those prohibitions was discriminatory and would be illegal" and that the act denoted that "all guests must receive the same treatment irrespective of gender". At the time, Davis said "the decision in relation to the centre table was the most difficult. The long traditions of the club are strongly in favour of restricting use of the centre table to men."

==== First proposed female member and subsequent rejection ====
In the late 1990s the lawyer Anthony Lester attempted to propose Mary Ann Sieghart as a member but her nomination was blocked by the chair of the club and Sieghart was taken for lunch at the club by Lester instead.

In 2011, the actress Joanna Lumley attempted to become the first female member in the club's then 180 year history, and she was the first female to be proposed as a member, proposed by Hugh Bonneville. The page upon which Bonneville wrote Lumley's nomination was torn out and expletives were written upon it. The Garrick Club consulted with the barrister Michael Beloff on the implications of the rules in law and asked him for a legal opinion concerning the admittance of female members. At the time he advised that women could not be proposed under the club's rules after Lumley was denied membership in 2011. Beloff advised that although the rules do not explicitly preclude women from joining, they state that "no candidate shall be eligible unless he be proposed by one member and seconded by another". The use of the masculine pronoun "he" led Beloff to conclude that the rule could be interpreted as referring to men only, while he also said the club's objectives also refer to "gentlemanly accomplishment and scholarship".

==== New legal opinion and failed vote to allow female membership ====
In November 2023, Beloff prepared and issued new legal opinion with the opposite conclusions to that of 2011. Beloff stated that there was "now a cogent argument" that the Law of Property Act 1925 means the masculine and feminine pronouns (he and she) can be used interchangeably in contracts. Beloff continued: "if so, there is no legal obstacle to the proposal of a woman for membership of the club by one member, seconded by another; nor, if she obtains the support required under the rules, any legal obstacle to her admission as a member of the club". It was reported that Beloff warned that the club was "likely to provoke an expensive lawsuit" if it continued to exclude women from membership.

Although Beloff notified the club's management of the changed legal opinion along with providing them with the revised advice, the club's management failed to share this guidance with members before a November 2023 poll on attitudes towards admitting women. The results of the poll indicated that 51% of members were in favour of admitting women, while 44% were opposed, but the rules of the club reportedly require a two-thirds majority to trigger a rule change. It was reported that the club's general committee decided unanimously not to act on Beloff's new advice.

In February 2024, Colin Brough, a retired theatre producer and a member for 40 years, was expelled from the club for having used the club's address book to contact members to express his conviction that women should be admitted immediately. After his exclusion he sent further e-mails to fellow members in which he criticised the club's "Putin-style" management. In e-mails sent to members, Brough alleged that some members of management were "against women members, which is why they have, in my view, taken such an active and belligerent role in preventing the membership from reading, considering and assessing for themselves the importance of the Beloff opinions". Brough accused club management members of deception, saying management contained a group of "misogynists [who] want to keep women out" and said the Garrick was becoming a "pariah" because of its attitude to women.

==== Support for female membership by current members ====
Some current members have openly stated their support of the Garrick Club opening up its membership to women. John Simpson, the journalist, foreign correspondent and chief editor for world affairs at the BBC, who has been a club member since 2001, has said,

I'm profoundly and passionately in favour of opening the Garrick's membership to women, because I feel the continued bar to their joining is an embarrassing blight on an otherwise delightful institution.

Likewise, Stephen Fry has said he feels "ashamed and mortified by the continuing exclusion of women from our club". The actor Brian Cox, a member since 1996, has said it was "about time" membership was opened up to women, and that "this archaic practice is ridiculous in the 21st century". Simon Case, head of the civil service argued that he wished to "make the change from within" in referral to the Club's exclusion of female members.

==== Public support and support from judiciary and legal professionals for female membership ====
After the rejection of Joanna Lumley's proposed membership in 2011, various public figures campaigned for female members. In 2015, Baroness Hale, as the then-president of the Supreme Court, protested about the club's continued exclusion of women and the acquiescence of its members in that policy. She has said that "I regard it as quite shocking that so many of my colleagues belong to the Garrick, but they don't see what all the fuss is about", arguing that judges "should be committed to the principle of equality for all". In reaction to the vote maintaining the customary exclusion of women as members, Dinah Rose, a leading barrister specialising in human rights and public law, urged leading legal professionals including members of the Supreme Court, to "reconsider" their membership in the club.

In September 2020, the entrepreneur Emily Bendell threatened a legal challenge over the club's refusal to admit women as members under the terms of the Equality Act 2010. She asserts that the rule breaches the Equality Act 2010, but failed to address how the Garrick failed to meet the specific exemptions mentioned in the act that protected same-sex sporting and social clubs. Bendell subsequently launched a petition against the club which attracted the signatures of over 300 senior legal professions.

Signing the above petition, Cherie Blair recalled how, in 1976, she watched:

her fellow trainee barrister and future husband Tony Blair being admitted into the club [as a guest]... while she was shut outside [because women were allowed as guests but not at the centre table]. She described the lack of progress as 'outrageous'. 'Forty-five years ago, I was left standing outside the Garrick while my supervisor took my fellow pupil Tony Blair inside [to the club's centre table]. It's outrageous that so little progress has been made since then' ...

== Art ==
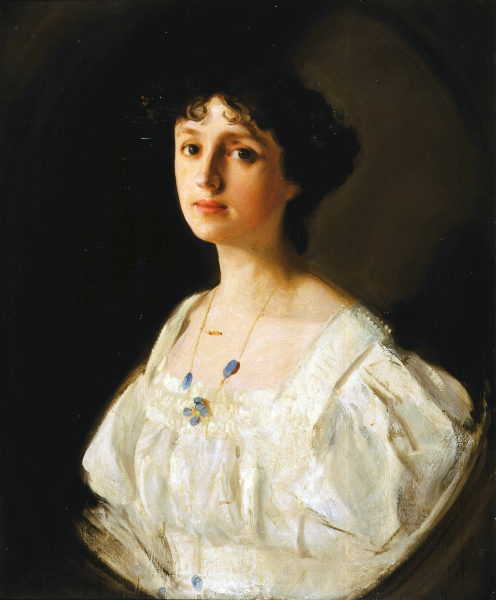
Charles Sims, Dame Lilian Braithwaite (c. 1902)

The club holds a substantial collection of artworks representing the history of British theatre. There are over 1000 paintings, drawings and sculptures, a selection of theatrical memorabilia, and thousands of prints and photographs.

The collection originated with the actor Charles Mathews, one of the original members of the club who had a passion for collecting theatrical portraits; they were once displayed by him in a gallery at his home, Ivy Cottage, in Highgate, north London. Mathews managed to secure a large number of pictures from the collection of Thomas Harris, who had been manager of the Theatre Royal, Covent Garden, and which included paintings by the likes of Johann Zoffany, Francis Hayman and Gainsborough Dupont. He also actively commissioned artists such as Samuel De Wilde to paint all the popular stars of the stage at that time (there are 196 works by De Wilde in the collection).

Mathews had hoped to sell the collection to the club and it appears that lengthy negotiations were entered into without any result. It was eventually purchased by a wealthy stockbroker and donated to the club, having already hung on its walls for several years.

The collection continued to grow with many being presented by artist members, such as Clarkson Frederick Stanfield and David Roberts, who with fellow scene painter Louis Haghe painted a series of large canvases, especially for the Smoking Room at the old Clubhouse. Roberts' Temple at Baalbec remains today one of the most important paintings by that artist. Sir John Everett Millais is represented by one of his most important portraits, that of Henry Irving which he painted and presented to the club in 1884.

The picture collection continued to expand throughout the twentieth century with artists such as Edward Seago and Feliks Topolski both represented.

== Notable deceased members ==
In 2011, the Garrick Club newsletter compiled a list of 100 notable deceased members (since updated):

- William Makepeace Thackeray, 1811–1863
- Thomas Creswick, 1811–1869
- Charles Dickens, 1812–1870
- John Russell, 1st Earl Russell, 1792–1878
- Anthony Trollope, 1815–1882
- Wilkie Collins, 1824–1889
- Sir James Fitzjames Stephen, 1st Baronet, 1829–1894
- Sir John Everett Millais, 1829–1896
- Sir J. M. Barrie, 1860–1897
- Charles Russell, Baron Russell of Killowen, 1832–1900
- Sir Arthur Sullivan, 1842–1900
- Sir Henry Irving, 1838–1905
- King Edward VII, 1841–1910
- Sir W. S. Gilbert, 1836–1911
- George Grossmith, 1847–1912
- Sir John Tenniel, 1820–1914
- Sir Herbert Beerbohm Tree, 1852–1917
- William Waldorf Astor, 1st Viscount Astor, 1848–1919
- Hardinge Giffard, 1st Earl of Halsbury, 1823–1921
- Edward Guinness, 1st Earl of Iveagh, 1847–1927
- Sir Edward Marshall Hall, 1858–1927
- F. E. Smith, 1st Earl of Birkenhead, 1878–1930
- Arnold Bennett, 1867–1931
- Sir Arthur Wing Pinero, 1855–1934
- Sir Gerald du Maurier, 1873–1934
- Edward Carson, Baron Carson, 1854–1935
- Rufus Isaacs, 1st Marquess of Reading, 1860–1935
- Gordon Hewart, 1st Viscount Hewart, 1870–1943
- Sir Edwin Lutyens,1869–1944
- H. G. Wells, 1866–1946
- Sir Seymour Hicks, 1871–1949
- A. A. Milne, 1882–1956
- Sir Alfred Munnings, 1878–1959
- Augustus John, 1878–1961
- Sir Thomas Beecham, 1879–1961
- Norman Birkett, 1st Baron Birkett, 1883–1962
- Hugh Gaitskell, 1906–1963
- W. Somerset Maugham, 1874–1965
- T. S. Eliot, 1888–1965
- Giles Cooper, 1918–1966
- Arthur Ransome, 1884–1967
- David Maxwell Fyfe, 1st Earl of Kilmuir, 1900–1967
- Sir Donald Wolfit, 1902–1968
- Sir Noël Coward, 1899–1973
- W. H. Auden, 1907–1973
- Jack Hawkins, 1910–1973
- Sir P. G. Wodehouse, 1881–1975
- Sir Neville Cardus, 1888–1975
- Sir Arthur Bliss, 1891–1975
- Alastair Sim, 1900–1976
- Sir Terence Rattigan, 1911–1977
- Harold Abrahams, 1899–1978
- Group Captain Sir Douglas Bader, 1910–1982
- Kenneth More, 1914–1982
- Kenneth Clark, Baron Clark, 1903–1983
- David Niven, 1910–1983
- J. B. Priestley, 1894–1984
- Sir John Betjeman, 1906–1984
- Richard Burton, 1925–1984
- Sir Michael Redgrave, 1908–1985
- Sir Osbert Lancaster, 1908–1986
- Sir Huw Wheldon, 1916–1986
- Sir Melford Stevenson, 1902–1987
- Laurence Olivier, Baron Olivier, 1907–1989
- Sir A. J. Ayer, 1910–1989
- Sir Anthony Quayle, 1913–1989
- Gerald Gardiner, Baron Gardiner, 1900–1990
- Malcolm Muggeridge, 1903–1990
- Sir Rex Harrison, 1908–1990
- Robert Morley, 1908–1992
- Michael Havers, Baron Havers, 1923–1992
- Sir David Napley, 1915–1994
- John Osborne, 1929–1994
- Sir Michael Hordern, 1911–1995
- Sir Kingsley Amis, 1922–1995
- Sir Isaiah Berlin, 1909–1997
- Peter Taylor, Baron Taylor of Gosforth, 1930–1997
- Eric Ambler, 1909–1998
- Hugh Cudlipp, Baron Cudlipp, 1913–1998
- Raymond Raikes, 1910–1999
- Sir Hugh Casson, 1910–1999
- Yehudi Menuhin, Baron Menuhin, 1916–1999
- Sir John Gielgud, 1904–2000
- Douglas Fairbanks, Jr., 1909–2000
- Sir Alec Guinness, 1914–2000
- Sir Robin Day, 1923–2000
- George Carman, 1929–2001
- Hartley Shawcross, Baron Shawcross, 1902–2003
- Peter Carter-Ruck, 1914–2003
- John Lanchbery, 1923–2003
- Leslie Scarman, Baron Scarman, 1911–2004
- Sir Peter Ustinov, 1921–2004
- Sir John Mills, 1908–2005
- Ian Richardson, 1934–2007
- Sir Geoffrey Cox, 1910–2008
- Paul Scofield, 1922–2008
- Ian Wallace, 1919–2009
- Sir John Mortimer, 1923–2009
- Ralf Dahrendorf, Baron Dahrendorf, 1929–2009
- Sir Charles Mackerras, 1925–2010
- Richard Attenborough, Baron Attenborough, 1923–2014
- Sir Donald Sinden, 1923–2014
- Roy Dotrice, 1923–2017
- Roy Hudd, 1936–2020
- Richard Stoker, 1938–2021
- Timothy West, 1934–2024
- Roy Hattersley, Baron Hattersley, 1932–2026

== See also ==
- List of members' clubs in London
- List of women's clubs
