= William Davies (actor) =

English stage actor

William Davies (1751–1809) was an English stage actor and singer. Born in London, Davies began his career in the provinces including at Norwich before coming to Richmond Theatre in the summer of 1770. He made his London debut at the Theatre Royal, Drury Lane in September that year and joined the company which was under the management of David Garrick and later Richard Brinsley Sheridan. In 1780 he transferred to the company of the Theatre Royal, Covent Garden and remained there for the next fourteen years, interspersing it with summer appearances at the Haymarket where he continued to appear until 1799. He died in 1809 was buried at St Paul's Church in Covent Garden. His wife Elizabeth Davies also acted alongside him at Norwich and Drury Lane before her death in 1782.

== Selected roles ==
- Soldier in The Grecian Daughter by Arthur Murphy (1772)
- Sebastian in Werter by Frederick Reynolds (1786)
- Young Meanwell in Tit for Tat by George Colman the Elder (1786)
- CAptain Rampart in The Family Party by George Colman the Younger (1790)
- King Edward in Cambro-Britons by James Boaden (1798)

== Bibliography ==
- Highfill, Philip H, Burnim, Kalman A. & Langhans, Edward A. A Biographical Dictionary of Actors, Actresses, Musicians, Dancers, Managers & Other Stage Personnel in London, 1660–1800, Volume 13. SIU Press, 1993.
- Straub, Kristina, G. Anderson, Misty and O'Quinn, Daniel . The Routledge Anthology of Restoration and Eighteenth-Century Drama. Taylor & Francis, 2017.
