= Ann Heard =

English stage actress

Ann Heard (1750–1797) was an English stage actress and dancer. Born Ann Madden, she first appeared at the King's Theatre in London under the management of Spranger Barry in 1766. After dancing at Drury Lane the following year she joined the Theatre Royal, Covent Garden and continued to dance there until 1777. In 1771 she married William Heard, a physician and minor playwright with whom she had a daughter Elizabeth Heard. In 1783 she joined the company at Drury Lane, along with her daughter who performed as a child actor. By now she focuses principally on acting roles, often playing soubrettes. She remained at Drury Lane for the rest of her life, also appearing at Richmond and the Haymarket. Her daughter was also acting at both theatres, but was billed as Miss Heard to distinguish her from her mother.

== Bibliography ==
- Highfill, Philip H., Burnim, Kalman A. & Langhans Edward A. A Biographical Dictionary of Actors, Volume 7, Habgood to Houbert: Actresses, Musicians, Dancers, Managers, and Other Stage Personnel in London, 1660-1800. SIU Press, 1982.
