= Joseph Knight (Royal Navy officer) =

Rear-Admiral Sir Joseph Knight
- Born: c.1708
- Died: 8 September 1775
- Military career
- Allegiance: Great Britain
- Branch: Royal Navy
- Service years: 1727–1775
- Rank: Rear-Admiral
- Commands: HMS Guarland's Prize; HMS Augusta; HMS Ruby; East Indies Station; HMS Rainbow; HMS Fougueux; HMS Princess Mary; HMS Belleisle; HMS Ramillies; HMS Ocean
- Conflicts: War of the Austrian Succession; Raid on Lorient; Seven Years' War; Capture of Gorée; Siege of Havana

Rear-Admiral Sir Joseph Knight (c.1708 – 8 September 1775) was a Royal Navy officer who served as Commander-in-Chief, East Indies Station from 1752 to 1754.

== Naval career ==
Knight joined the Royal Navy in 1727. Promoted to captain on 31 July 1746, he was given command of the fourth-rate HMS Augusta and then, later that year, the fourth-rate HMS Ruby, in which he took part in the raid on Lorient in September 1746 and then sailed out to the far east and served as Commander-in-Chief, East Indies Station from 1752 to 1754. He went on to command, successively, the fifth-rate HMS Rainbow, the third-rate HMS Fougueux (in which he took part in the capture of Gorée in 1758), the fourth-rate HMS Princess Mary, the third-rate HMS Belleisle (in which he took part in the siege of Havana in 1762), the third-rate HMS Ramillies and the second-rate HMS Ocean.

His daughter was the author Ellis Cornelia Knight.
