= James Winston =

James Winston may refer to:

- James Winston (thespian) (1773–1843), English strolling player and theatre manager
- James Winston (baseball), American Negro league pitcher in the 1930s
- James Brown Winston, medical officer and councillor in Los Angeles, California
- Jimmy Winston, English musician and actor
- James Duarte Winston, American rugby union player, gold medallist at the 1920 Summer Olympics

== See also ==
- Jameis Winston, American football quarterback
