= A Prior Claim =

1805 play

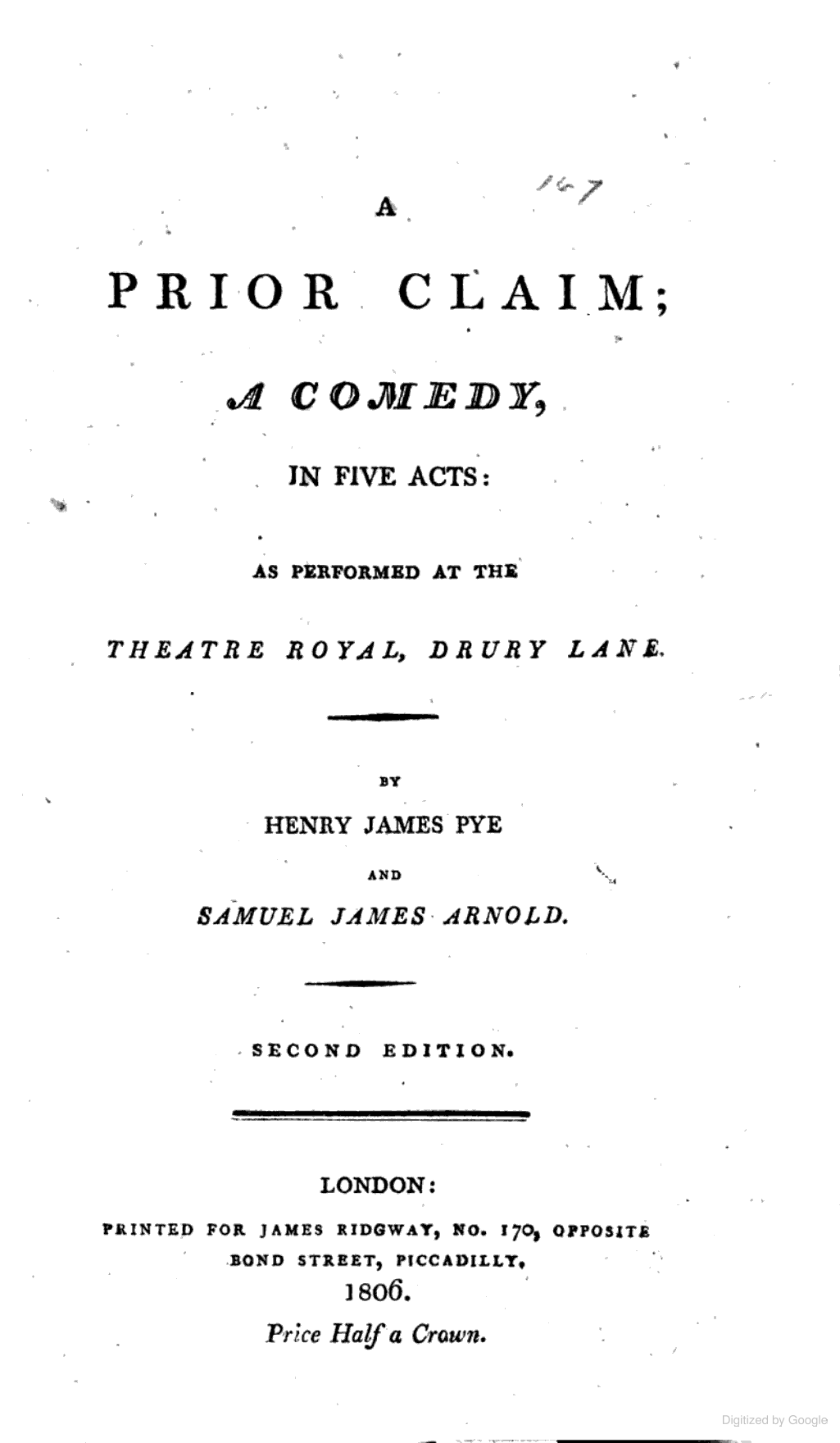
- Written by: Henry James Pye; Samuel James Arnold
- Original language: English
- Genre: Comedy
- Setting: England, present day

Premiere
- Date premiered: 29 October 1805
- Place premiered: Theatre Royal, Drury Lane, London

A Prior Claim is an 1805 comedy play by the English writer and poet laureate Henry James Pye and Samuel James Arnold. It premiered at the Theatre Royal, Drury Lane on 29 October 1805. The original cast included William Dowton as Sir William Freeman, Vincent De Camp as Young Freeman, Robert William Elliston as Henry Mortimer, William Barrymore as Colonel Raymond, Robert Palmer as Lounger, John Henry Johnstone as Patrick O'Shatter, Maria Rebecca Davison as Maria, Harriet Siddons as Emily and Maria Theresa Kemble as Fanny. It was Pye's third play to be staged and marked a break from his two previous works, the historical tragediesThe Siege of Meaux (1794) and Adelaide (1800).

== Bibliography ==
- Greene, John C. Theatre in Dublin, 1745-1820: A Calendar of Performances, Volume 6. Lexington Books, 2011.
- Nicoll, Allardyce. A History of English Drama 1660–1900: Volume IV. Cambridge University Press, 2009.
