= Cockran Joseph Booth =

British stage actor

Cockran Joseph Booth (died 1789) was a British stage actor of the eighteenth century. It is possible that he was the Mr. Booth who had acting roles at the Haymarket and Drury Lane theatres during the 1760s, but the first definite information is his role in hiring the Barton Street Theatre in Gloucester in 1772 to put on plays. He then acted in Bristol and briefly managed Richmond Theatre. From 1774 to 1789 he was a member of the company of the Theatre Royal, Covent Garden in London, generally playing character roles as older men, and also filling in as prompter at one point. He fell seriously ill in the summer of 1789 and died on 7 July. His wife, who he married during his provincial career, was an actress who also appeared at Covent Garden billed as Mrs Booth. Her husband left her a quarter share in the Theatre Royal, Margate which he had purchased in 1787 from Thomas Robson.

== Bibliography ==
- Burnim, Kalman A. & Highfill, Philip H. John Bell, Patron of British Theatrical Portraiture: A Catalog of the Theatrical Portraits in His Editions of Bell's Shakespeare and Bell's British Theatre. SIU Press, 1998.
- Highfill, Philip H, Burnim, Kalman A. & Langhans, Edward A. A Biographical Dictionary of Actors, Actresses, Musicians, Dancers, Managers and Other Stage Personnel in London, 1660–1800, Volumes 1–2. SIU Press, 1973.
