= The Wedding Day (play) =

1794 play

- Original language: English
- Written by: Elizabeth Inchbald
- Genre: Comedy

Premiere
- Date: 1 November 1794
- Place: Theatre Royal, Drury Lane, London

The Wedding Day is a comedy play by the English writer Elizabeth Inchbald. An afterpiece, it premiered at the Theatre Royal, Drury Lane in London on 1 November 1794. The original cast included William Barrymore as Lord Rakeland, Thomas King as Sir Adam Contest, John Hayman Packer as Mr Millden, Charles Kemble as Mr Contest, Charlotte Tidswell as Lady Autumn, Dorothea Jordan as Lady Contest, Elizabeth Hopkins as Mrs Hamford and Elizabeth Heard as Hannah. The Irish premiere took place at the Crow Street Theatre in Dublin on 15 February 1797.

== Bibliography ==
- Greene, John C. Theatre in Dublin, 1745-1820: A Calendar of Performances, Volume 6. Lexington Books, 2011.
- Nicoll, Allardyce. A History of English Drama 1660–1900: Volume III. Cambridge University Press, 2009.
- Hogan, C.B (ed.) The London Stage, 1660–1800: Volume V. Southern Illinois University Press, 1968.
- Robertson, Ben P. Elizabeth Inchbald's Reputation: A Publishing and Reception History. Routledge, 2015.
