= Garrick Club Clubhouse =

Grade II clubhouse in London, England built 1860

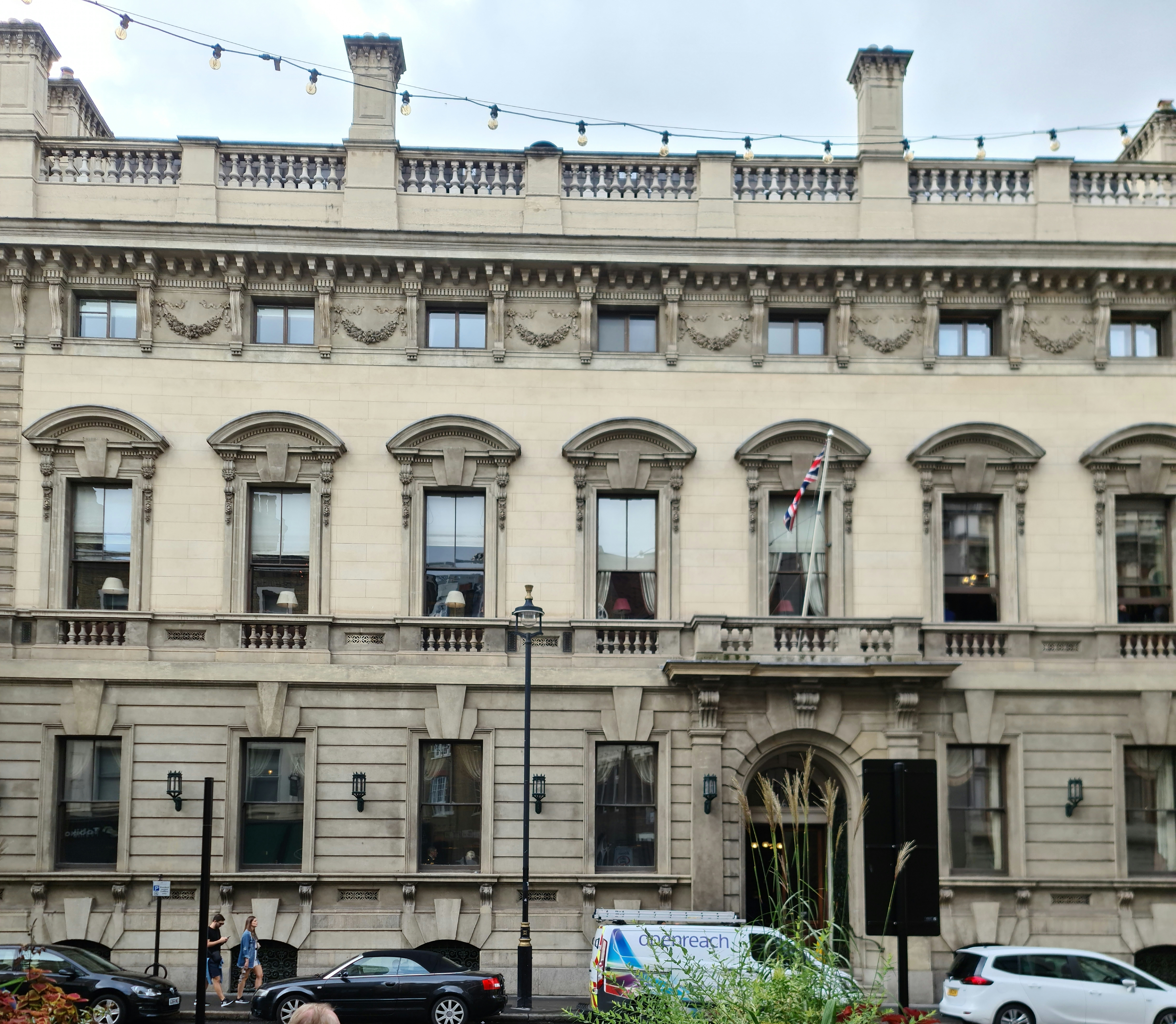
- Garrick Club Clubhouse

- Location within Greater London

General information
- Location: 15 Garrick St, London WC2E 9AY, United Kingdom, London, England
- Coordinates: 51°30′41″N 0°07′35″W

Design and construction
- Designations

Listed Building – Grade II
- Official name: The Garrick Clubhouse
- Designated: 14 Jan 1970
- Reference no.: 1066808

Website
- garrickclub.co.uk

The Garrick Club Clubhouse is located on Garrick Street in London's Covent Garden district. It was built in 1860 for the Garrick Club.

It is listed Grade II* on the National Heritage List for England.

In the late 19th-century, the art collection of the club was available to be viewed by the public every Wednesday morning if introduced by a member.

== Location ==
The clubhouse was originally located at 35 King Street in 1834. It moved to its new clubhouse in 1860 with an address of 15 Garrick Street. The street was named for the club.

== Design ==
It was designed by Frederick Marrable in the style of an Italian palazzo. It is 3 storeys in height, with a basement and a mansard roof. The interior features Italianate mouldings and a large staircase with an ornate balustrade.
