= The Family Party (play) =

1789 play

- Original language: English
- Written by: George Colman the Younger
- Genre: Comedy
- Setting: Bath, 1789

Premiere
- Date: 11 July 1789
- Place: Theatre Royal, Haymarket, London

The Family Party is a 1789 comedy play by the British writer George Colman the Younger. A two-act farce, it premiered at the Theatre Royal, Haymarket in London on 11 July 1789. The original Haymarket cast included Robert Baddeley as Old Spriggins, William Davies as Captain Rampart, Robert Palmer as Pinch, John Bannister as Sir Toby Twaddle, Elizabeth Heard as Laura and Lydia Webb as Mrs Malmsley.

== Bibliography ==
- Greene, John C. Theatre in Dublin, 1745-1820: A Calendar of Performances, Volume 6. Lexington Books, 2011.
- Nicoll, Allardyce. A History of English Drama 1660–1900: Volume III. Cambridge University Press, 2009.
- Hogan, C.B (ed.) The London Stage, 1660–1800: Volume V. Southern Illinois University Press, 1968.
