= HMS Hero (1759) =

Ship of the line of the Royal Navy

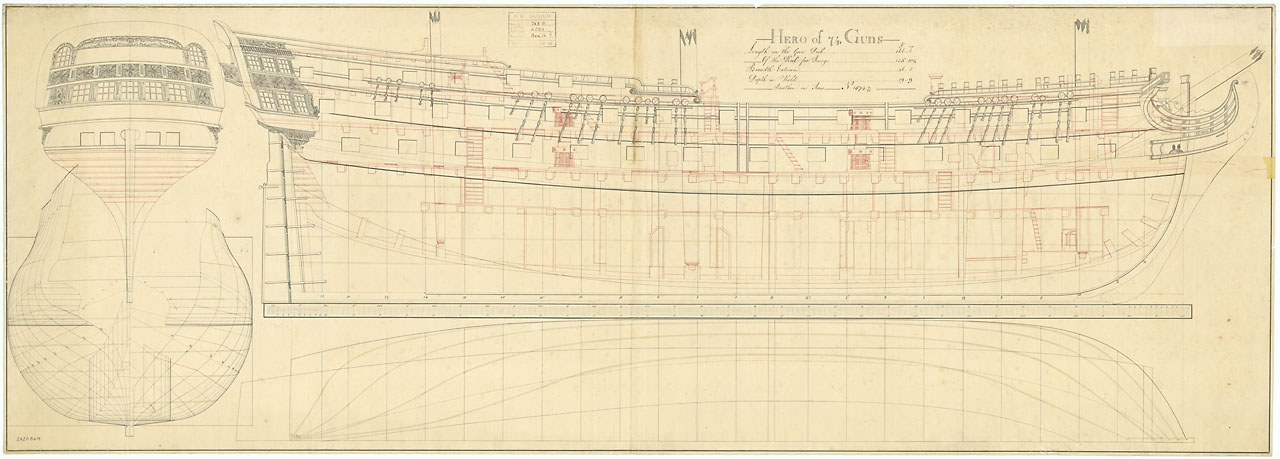
- Hero

History

Great Britain
- Name: HMS Hero
- Ordered: 25 May 1756
- Builder: Plymouth Dockyard
- Launched: 28 March 1759
- Fate: Broken up, 1810
- Notes: Prison ship from 1793

General characteristics
- Class & type: 74-gun third rate ship of the line
- Tons burthen: 157420/94 (bm)
- Length: 166 ft 6 in (50.75 m) (gundeck)
- Beam: 46 ft 8 in (14.22 m)
- Depth of hold: 19 ft 9 in (6.02 m)
- Propulsion: Sails
- Sail plan: Full-rigged ship
- Armament: 74 guns: Gundeck: 28 × 32 pdrs; Upper gundeck: 28 × 18 pdrs; Quarterdeck: 14 × 9 pdrs; Forecastle: 4 × 9 pdrs

HMS Hero was a 74-gun third rate ship of the line of the Royal Navy, designed by Sir Thomas Slade built by Thomas Bucknall at Plymouth Dockyard and launched on 28 March 1759. She was the only ship built to her draught.

Hero and HMS Venus captured the French East Indiaman Bertin on 3 April 1761 and sent her into Plymouth. There the Royal Navy purchased her and commissioned as the third rate Belleisle.

From 1763 to 1767 Hero was commanded by Captain Paul Ourry.

She had a part in the Battle of Porto Praya, a naval battle that took place during the American Revolutionary War on 16 April 1781, between a British squadron under Commodore George Johnstone and a French squadron under the Bailli de Suffren.

Under the command of Captain Theophilus Jones, she took part in the 1783 Battle of Cuddalore.

She was converted to a prison ship in 1793, and was eventually broken up in 1810.
