= Cross Partners =

1792 play

- Written by: Elizabeth Inchbald
- Original language: English
- Genre: Comedy

Premiere
- Date premiered: 25 July 1792
- Place premiered: Theatre Royal, Haymarket, London

Cross Partners is a 1792 comedy play by the British writer Elizabeth Inchbald. It premiered at the Theatre Royal, Haymarket in London on 25 July 1792. The original Haymarket cast included Richard Wilson as Sir Charles Cullender, Thomas King as General Touchwood, James Brown Williamson as George Cleveland, John Palmer as Captain Herbert, Ralph Wewitzer as Corporal Smack, Charles Farley as Pompey, John Henry Johnstone as Thomas, Lydia Webb as Lady Diana Dupely, Charlotte Goodall as Maria Sydney, Louisa Fontenelle as Mrs Mutter and Elizabeth Heard as Louisa Fairfax. It enjoyed a solid run of nine performances.

== Bibliography ==
- Greene, John C. Theatre in Dublin, 1745-1820: A Calendar of Performances, Volume 6. Lexington Books, 2011.
- Nicoll, Allardyce. A History of English Drama 1660–1900: Volume IV. Cambridge University Press, 2009.
- Robertson, Ben P. Elizabeth Inchbald's Reputation: A Publishing and Reception History. Routledge, 2015.
