= Samuel James Arnold =

English dramatist and theatrical manager

Samuel James Arnold (1774–1852)
- Born: 1774
- Died: 1852 (aged 77–78)
- Occupation: Theatre manager

Samuel James Arnold (1774–1852) was an English dramatist and theatrical manager. Under his management the Lyceum Theatre, London became the English Opera House, and staged the first English productions of many operas, including in 1824 Carl Maria von Weber's Der Freischütz.

== Life ==
Arnold was the son of the composer Samuel Arnold, and was given an artistic education. In 1794 at the Haymarket Theatre he produced Auld Robin Gray, a musical play in two acts; and this was followed by other works of the same class: Who Pays the Reckoning? produced at the Haymarket in 1795; The Shipwreck, produced at the Drury Lane Theatre in 1796; The Irish Legacy, produced at the Haymarket in 1797; and The Veteran Tar, produced at Drury Lane in 1801. Foul Deeds Will Rise, first played at the Haymarket in 1804, was described by the critic John Genest as "an unnatural mixture of tragedy and farce". A Prior Claim, produced at Drury Lane in 1805, was a comedy written in conjunction with Henry James Pye. Man and Wife, or More Secrets than One, a comedy produced at Drury Lane in 1809, was performed thirty times.

In 1809 Arnold obtained from the Lord Chamberlain a license to open the Lyceum in the Strand as an English opera house. The building was previously devoted to subscription concerts, picture exhibitions, feats of horsemanship and conjuring. Upon the destruction of the Drury Lane Theatre by fire in the same year, the Drury Lane Company moved to the Lyceum, and remained there for three seasons. The license had been originally granted in the belief that the house would be open only for four months in the summer, and would become a nursery of singers for the winter theatres. Up All Night, or The Smuggler's Cave, Britain's Jubilee, The Maniac, or Swiss Banditti, and Plots, or The North Tower are the titles of musical plays by Arnold presented by the Drury Lane Company during their occupancy of the English Opera House. The theatre was afterwards open under his own management, when his operas The King's Proxy, The Devil's Bridge, The Americans, Frederick the Great, Baron Trenck, Broken Promises and dramas including Two Words and Free and Easy were produced in succession. In 1811 he staged M.P., a comic opera to a libretto by Thomas Moore.

William Hazlitt wrote in 1816 of Arnold's The King's Proxy that it was "the essence of four hundred rejected pieces … with all that is threadbare in plot, lifeless in wit, and sickly in sentiment" and that "Mr. Arnold writes with the fewest ideas possible; his meaning is more nicely balanced between sense and nonsense than that of any of his competitors; he succeeds from the perfect insignificance of his pretensions, and fails to offend through downright imbecility." Arnold's Two Words, however, Hazlitt pronounced "a delightful little piece. It is a scene with robbers and midnight murder in it; and all such scenes are delightful to the reader or spectator. We can conceive nothing better managed than the plot of this."

In 1812 Arnold had been invited to undertake the direction of the Drury Lane Theatre; he resigned his office on the suicide of Samuel Whitbread in 1815. In 1816 the English Opera House was reopened by Arnold, having been rebuilt on an enlarged scale by Samuel Beazley, the architect, at a cost of £80,000.

In 1824 Arnold produced for the first time in England a version of Carl Maria von Weber's Der Freischütz, which had been previously refused by the two patent theatres. Other foreign operas of note, the Tarare of Antonio Salieri, The Freebooters by Ferdinando Paer, The Robber's Bride by Ferdinand Ries, and Heinrich Marschner's Der Vampyr, were afterwards produced at the English Opera House for the first time in England. In 1830 the theatre was destroyed by fire. In 1834 the rebuilt Lyceum, also by Samuel Beazley, was opened to the public. The English operas Nourjahad by Edward Loder and The Mountain Sylph by John Barnett were produced under Arnold's management.

Arnold was a magistrate.

== Family ==
In 1803 Arnold married the daughter of Henry James Pye, the Poet Laureate. Thomas James Arnold was his son.
