= Louisa Fontenelle =

English actress

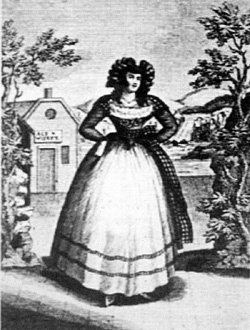
- Louisa Fontenelle as Moggy McGilpin in The Highland Reel at Covent Garden ca. 1788. Engraving by Barlow.
- Born: 31 August 1769; London, England
- Died: 30 October 1799 (aged 30); Charleston, South Carolina, U.S.
- Occupations: Actress and singer
- Known for: Played in London and Scotland before marrying and heading off to America to join the Boston Theatre

Louisa Fontenelle (31 August 1769 – 30 October 1799) was an actress and singer who played in London and Scotland before marrying and heading off to America to join the Boston Theatre. In Dumfries, her acting came to the attention of Robert Burns, who wrote a number of poems for her.

== Early life ==
Fontenelle was born in London on 31 August 1769, the daughter of John and Ann Fontenell. She was sent to boarding school, after which, having "discovered so much agreeable vivacity", she was persuaded by friends to take up acting as a career.

== Early career ==
Fontenelle was recommended by the proprietor of the Public Advertiser, Henry Sampson Woodfall, who wrote to Thomas Harris, proprietor of the Covent Garden Theatre. The result of his submission was that in 1788 Fontenelle appeared as Moggy McGilpin, the heroine in John O’Keeffe’s comic opera, The Highland Reel. The show was a huge success and immediately launched her acting career. A newspaper reviewer on the morning following the opening declared: "Miss Fontanelle, as a breeches figure, will rank with Jordan and Mrs Goodall."

Following her success in her debut role, she appeared as Sophia in John O’Keeffe’s The Toy and a controversial female MacHeath in John Gay's The Beggar's Opera. She was in the cast of Such Things Have Been and went on to play Mademoiselle D'Epingle in Richard Steele's The Funeral. After her benefit night on 2 May 1789, Fontenelle received adverse criticism for overacting and she and Thomas Harris parted company. She went north to join the company at the Theatre Royal, Edinburgh, where she played in various roles for a season before returning to London to play at the Haymarket Theatre. Louisa was engaged by George Colman at the Haymarket Theatre to replace Miss George, who was now playing at the Theatre Royal, Dublin. She played there for four summer seasons, 1790 to 1793, but in the winter seasons played in Theatre Royal in Edinburgh, Glasgow and Dumfries.

== Fontenelle and Robert Burns ==
It was while she was playing at the Theatre Royal, Dumfries that she caught the eye of Robert Burns, who wrote a Prologue for her to recite at her benefit night on 26 November 1792 on the Rights of Women. This was accompanied by a letter in which he wrote, "To you, Madam, on our humble Dumfries boards, I have been more indebted for entertainment, than ever I was in prouder Theatres. Your charms as a woman would ensure applause to the most indifferent Actress, and your theatrical talents would secure admiration to the plainest figure." In December of the following year, Burns wrote another address for her benefit night. He also wrote a poem for her entitled To Miss Fontenelle, on Seeing her in a Favorite Character.

== Marriage and emigration ==
While at Dumfries, she also caught the eye of, and later married, the theatre manager, John Brown Williamson, a friend of Burns. Shortly after they were married, in 1796, the couple emigrated to Boston, America. In their American debuts in the Boston Theatre, John played the Moor in Othello and Louisa 'Little Pickle' in Bickerstaff's The Spoil'd Child. Williamson's acting was criticised in that he "lacked flexibility of countenance." Fontenelle's role, on the other hand, was described as "the most astonishing and brilliant display of theatrical genius ever exhibited in America." After their first season, Williamson became manager of the Boston Theatre but his "unfortunate habit of undervaluing everything American" led to failure "through a want of co-operation and support from the stockholder." They later joined the Charleston Company of Actors in South Carolina and played in Boston and New York. Fontenelle died of yellow fever at Charleston on 30 October 1799. Williamson died two years later in 1801.
