= HMS Venus (1758) =

Frigate of the Royal Navy

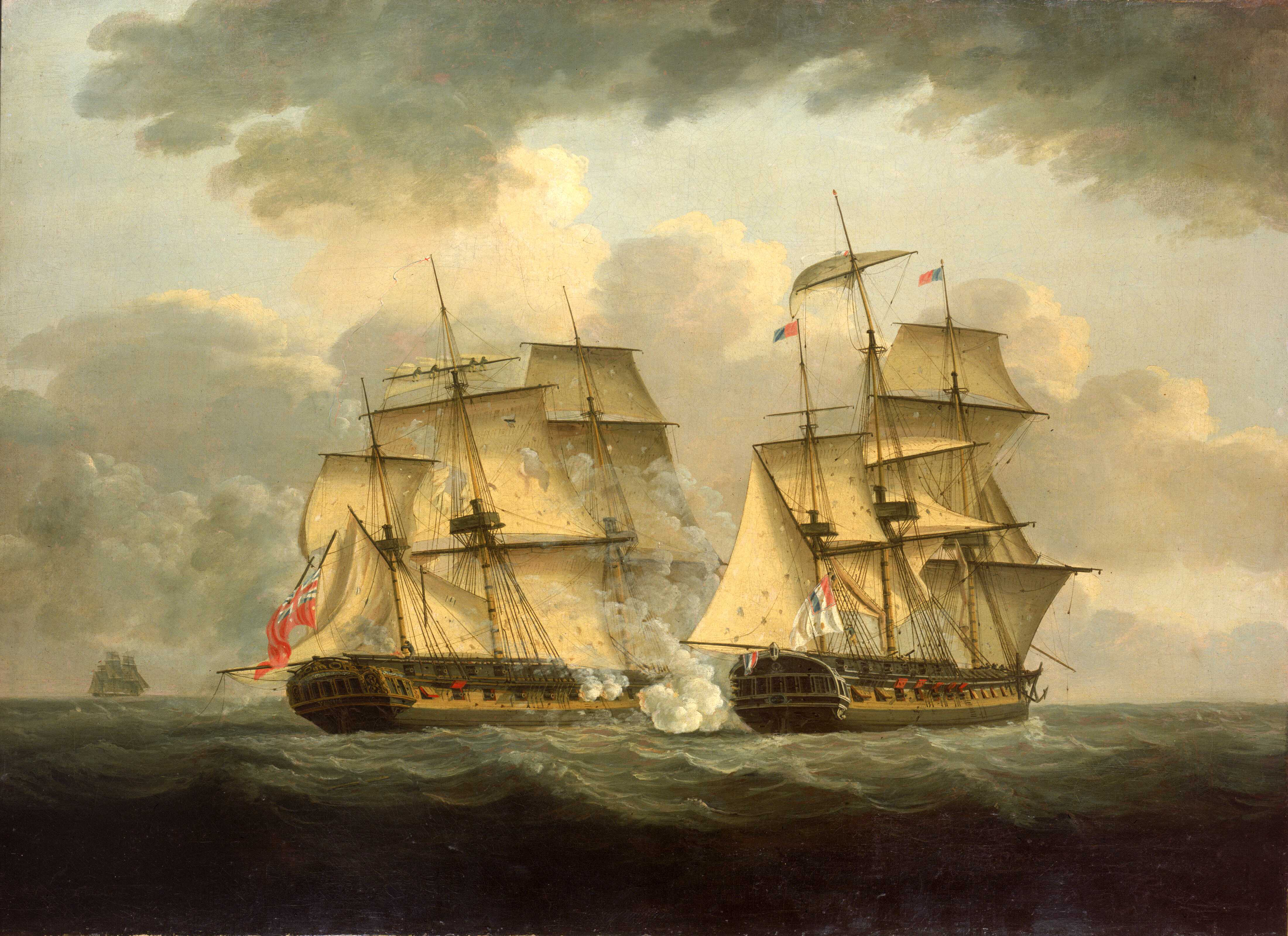
- Action between HMS Venus (left) and French frigate La Sémillante, 27 May 1793.

History

Great Britain
- Name: HMS Venus
- Ordered: 13 July 1756
- Builder: John Okill, Liverpool
- Laid down: 16 August 1756
- Launched: 11 March 1758
- Completed: 30 June 1758
- Commissioned: March 1758
- Renamed: HMS Heroine (1807)
- Fate: Sold to break up at Deptford, 22 September 1828

General characteristics
- Class & type: Venus-class fifth-rate frigate
- Tons burthen: 72229/94 (bm)
- Length: 128 ft 4 1/2 in (39.1 m) (gundeck); 106 ft 3 in (32.4 m) (keel)
- Beam: 35 ft 9 in (10.9 m)
- Depth of hold: 12 ft 4 in (3.8 m)
- Sail plan: Full-rigged ship
- Complement: 240 officers and men (215 from 1792)
- Armament: As built: Upperdeck: 26 × 12-pounder guns; QD: 8 × 6-pounder guns; Fc: 2 × 6-pounder guns; From 1792: Upperdeck: 24 × 12-pounder guns; QD: 6 × 6-pounder guns; Fc: 2 × 6-pounder guns

HMS Venus (renamed HMS Heroine in 1809) was the name ship of the 36-gun Venus-class fifth-rate frigates of the Royal Navy. She was launched in 1758 and served for more than half a century until 1809. She was reduced from 36 to 32 guns in 1792. She was sold in 1822.

== Career ==
On 18 May 1759, Venus, HMS Thames, and HMS Chatham, were in company when Venus intercepted the French frigate Arethuse near Audierne Bay (Baie d'Audierne (in French)). After a two-hour chase, Arethuse lost her top masts and was overtaken. Thames and Venus engaged her with heavy fire, causing 60 casualties before she surrendered. Arethuse subsequently had a lengthy career as HMS Arethusa. HMS Hero and Venus captured the French East Indiaman Bertin on 3 April 1761 and sent her into Plymouth. There the Royal Navy purchased her and commissioned as the third rate Belleisle.

On 23 September 1762 Venus and her sister ship HMS Lark were off Rame Head in Cornwall when they encountered an unidentified vessel which raised sail and fled. After a twelve-hour chase the vessel was overtaken and struck its colours in surrender to Venus. A boarding party from Venus determined the captured vessel to be a Galgo, a 14-gun Spanish privateer with a crew of 136 men.

== American Revolution ==
On 27 January, 1778 she and HMS Glory captured Massachusetts privateer schooner True Blue on the Georges Bank. Mount Hope Bay raids: She participated in the Raids.

== French Revolutionary Wars ==
On 27 May 1793, Venus, Captain Jonathon Faulkner, encountered the French frigate La Sémillante south-west of Cape Finisterre which resulted in close action. "The sails, rigging and spars of the British frigate had taken the brunt of the enemy fire and were extremely cut up so that a further engagement was inadvisable. Indeed she was lucky to escape an encounter with a fresh opponent."

On 16 October 1799, Venus ran aground on the Thrumb Cap Rock, 9 nautical miles (17 km) off Halifax, Nova Scotia, British America at the end of a voyage from an English Port. She was refloated and taken in to Halifax in a severely leaky condition, water flooding in at a rate of 4 feet per hour. She was placed under repair. On 17 July 1801, Tromp, Circe, and Venus left Portsmouth with a convoy to the West Indies.

== Napoleonic Wars ==
On the morning of 10 July 1805, Venus encountered the French privateer brig Hirondelle. After a chase of 65 miles, during which Hirondelle threw two of her 6-pounder guns overboard, Venus succeeded in capturing her quarry. Hirondelle, of Dunkirk, was armed with four 6-pounder guns and twelve 3-pounder guns, and had a crew of 90 men. She left Gigeon, Spain, on 27 June, but had not captured anything. However, on prior cruise, she had captured several vessels, most notably the Falmouth packet Queen Charlotte, which had resisted for some two hours before striking her colours.

On 18 January 1807 Venus captured the French privateer brig Determinée of Guadeloupe, one hundred leagues east of Barbados after a chase of 16 hours. Determinée had a crew of 108 men and was pierced for 20 guns but carried only 14. (Note: Prize money was paid in May 1815. A first-class share was worth £157 18s 9d; a fifth-class share, that of a seaman, was worth 18s 5½d.) The British took her into service as Netley.

Venus was paid-off and put into Ordinary in July 1807 at Woolwich. On 14 July 1807 she was renamed Heroine after the capture of the Danish vessel Venus.

Between March and May 1809 she was fitted for Baltic service. Captain Hood Hanway Christian recommissioned Heroine in March and commanded her until November 1809. Heroine participated in the reduction of Flushing in 1809 during the Walcheren Campaign. In this engagement Heroine was part of a squadron of ten frigates under the command of Captain Lord William Stuart. On 11 August 1809 this squadron sailed up the western Scheldt under a light wind, suffering minor damage from the shore batteries of Flushing and Cadzand. Two men were wounded on Heroine.

== Fate ==
Heroine was paid off and laid up at Sheerness between November 1809 and December 1823. Between 1817 and 1820 she served as a receiving ship. Then between December 1823 and June 1824 she underwent fitting at Woolwich to serve as a temporary convict ship. The Principal Officers and Commissioners of His Majesty's Navy offered "Heroine, of 32 guns and 722 tons", lying at Deptford, for sale on 22 September 1828. She was sold on that date to John Small Sedger for £1,170.
