= Ernst Schulze (chemist) =

German chemist (1840-1912)

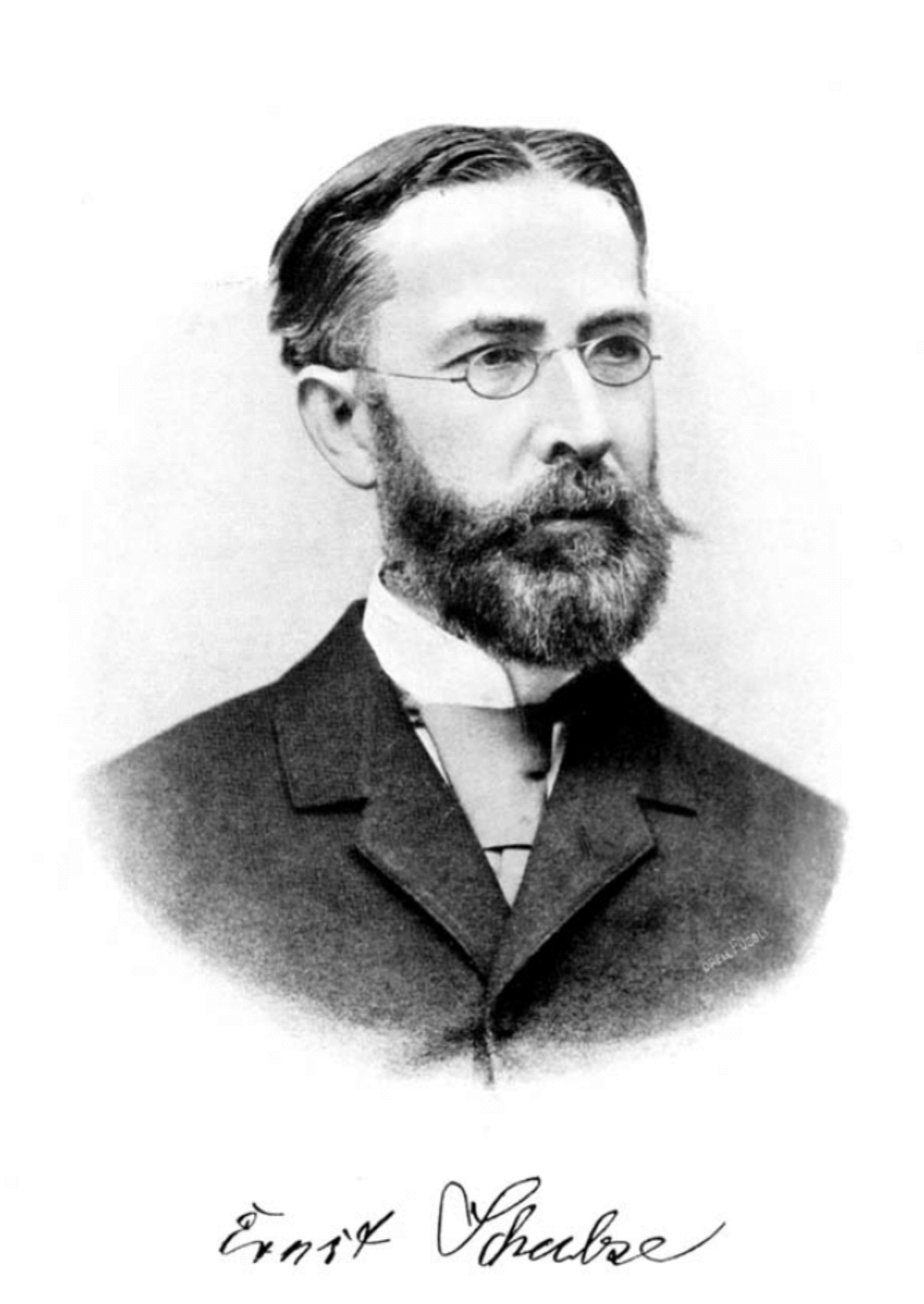
Ernst Schulze

Obituary by Ernst Winterstein in 1914

Ernst Schulze (German: [ˈʃʊltsə]; 31 July 1840, Bovenden near Göttingen – 15 June 1912, Zürich) was a German chemist who discovered a number of amino acids.

== Biography ==
Schulze's grandfather was the philosopher Gottlob Ernst Schulze, and his father held public office in the town where he was born: Bovenden near Göttingen. After completing school, Schulze studied chemistry at the University of Göttingen. Among his professors were Friedrich Wöhler and Heinrich Limpricht. He completed his final semester at Heidelberg, where he completed his studies under Robert Wilhelm Bunsen. Schulze then traveled to Jena, where he completed his doctoral studies as the assistant to Karl Gotthelf Lehmann and later to his successor, Anton Geuther, receiving his doctorate in 1867. He started his scientific career in Jena, and then went on to the agricultural research station at Weende near Göttingen, working under Wilhelm Henneberg, until in 1871 he was offered a position to lead a similar research station in Darmstadt. One year later, Schulze was appointed as professor for agricultural chemistry at the new agriculture and forestry school of the Zürich polytechnic, where his future father-in-law Adolf Kraemer had already been appointed as one of the first leaders.

During his four decades at Zürich, Schulze concentrated on a variety of phytochemical studies, in the course of which he and his doctoral students discovered the amino acids Glutamine, Phenylalanine and Arginine, among many other organic compounds. Schulze also laid emphasis on researching the importance of the amino acids Asparagine and Glutamine in the protein metabolism of plants. He also pioneered the investigation of plant lecithin, cholesterol and phytosterols. At the end of his time in Zürich, Schulze researched the role of carbohydrates in plant cell membranes. This systematic research into plant chemistry made Schulze one of the pioneers of the new science of biochemistry, at the time still called "physiological chemistry".

In the middle of the 1880s, Schulze was awarded the Liebig-Medal in silver, and in 1907 he won a prize from the Royal Society of Sciences in Göttingen. In 1910, in recognition of his life's work, the University of Heidelberg awarded him an honorary medical doctorate.

== Publications ==
- With Ernst Steiger: Ueber das Arginin. In: Zeitschrift für Physiologische Chemie. 11, 1887, p. 43 (online).
