= Jacques (novel) =

Novel by George Sand

Jacques (1833) is a novel by French author George Sand, née Amantine Dupin. The novel centers on an unhappy marriage between a retired soldier, aged 35 (Jacques), and his young teenaged bride, Fernanade. The novel is the first by Sand to be named after a male character. While previously, her novels had focused on female experiences within marriage, in Jacques, she turns her attention to describing a male partner in a marriage. The novel details how he feels about ongoing events in often painful detail.

It has been suggested by some critics that the character of Jacques later reappears as an unnamed fellow traveler in Sand's fictionalized travel account Letters of a Voyager.

== Plot ==
Jacques and Fernanda are newlyweds, but they are mismatched in many ways, not least in age and education. Both enter into marriage with high hopes, but these are quickly dashed by a massive quarrel early on in the book, which becomes an important turning point in the book. The means of reconciliation used by the two characters are very different. After the fight, Fernande attempts to mend the rift by begging and pleading, but Jacques responds with disgust.

Following this, Jacques invites his sister Sylvia and her companion Octave to stay with the couple as guests. Octave and Fernande fall in love. Faced with no choice but to challenge Octave to a duel or concede the marriage, Jacques can find no suitable alternative. He decides to disappear into a crevice in the Alps, never to return.

== Themes ==
While the novel never provides an explanation for the dissolution of Jacques and Fernande's marriage, the novel highlights that differences in how the couple express emotion and how they see the world. The inability of the couple to comprehend one other may be what causes their relationship, although the question is left open.

However, Sand also highlights the social aspects of this problem by emphasizing the youth of Ferndande, who is married by her family as a teenager, and the impossibility of the couple's divorcing under Napoleonic law. Like many of Sand's novels, Jacques argued in favor of the education and independence of 19th century women and against a view of marriage in which the husband dominated the wife legally.

Unlike her prior novels, Jacques depicts misunderstandings in a marriage not arranged out of convenience but originally based on love. Thus the novelist tackles a new topic in this exploration of men and women's intimate relations, differences in communication.

== Relation to Other Works ==
Many critics have compared Jacques it to her first two works, Indiana and Valentine due to their specific interest in women's equality, including the legal rights, education, and familial roles of women. Sand's early career focused on these issues extensively. While these were controversial topics, writing about them also helped build her reputation and attracted a wide following of readers who were interested in these themes.
