= Adelaide (1800 play) =

1800 play by Henry James Pye

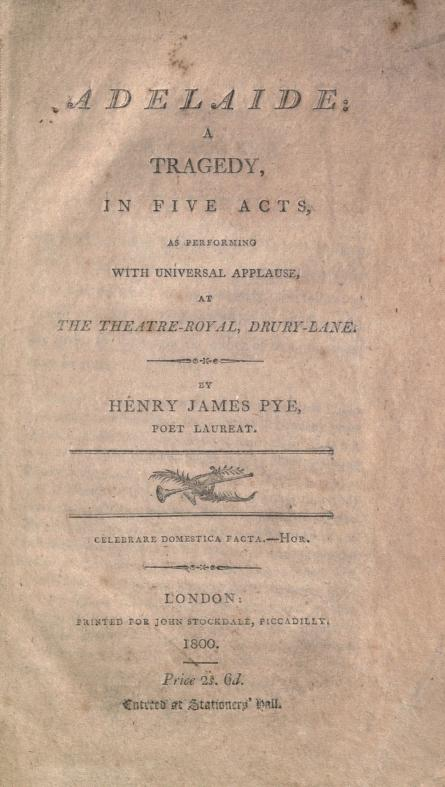
- Written by: Henry James Pye
- Original language: English
- Genre: Tragedy
- Setting: Chinon, France, 12th century

Premiere
- Date premiered: 25 January 1800
- Place premiered: Theatre Royal, Drury Lane, London

Adelaide is an 1800 historical tragedy by the English writer and poet laureate Henry James Pye. It premiered at the Theatre Royal, Drury Lane in London on 25 January 1800. The original cast included Sarah Siddons as Adelaide, James Aickin as King Henry, John Philip Kemble as Prince Richard, William Barrymore as Prince John, Charles Kemble as Clifford, Thomas Cory as Legate and Walter Maddocks as Officer and Elizabeth Heard as Emma. It is set during the reign of Henry II.

== Bibliography ==
- Greene, John C. Theatre in Dublin, 1745-1820: A Calendar of Performances, Volume 6. Lexington Books, 2011.
- Nicoll, Allardyce. A History of English Drama 1660–1900: Volume IV. Cambridge University Press, 2009.
