= HMS Belleisle (1761) =

Ship of the line of the Royal Navy

- Plan of Belleisle drawn in 1761, a captured French East Indiaman, prior to being fitted as a 64-gun third rate, two-decker.

History

France
- Name: Belleisle
- Launched: 1760
- Captured: 3 April 1761, by Royal Navy

Great Britain
- Name: HMS Belleisle
- Acquired: 3 April 1761
- Fate: Sold, 1819

General characteristics
- Class & type: 64-gun third-rate ship of the line
- Tons burthen: 149426/94 (bm)
- Length: 168 ft 5 1/2 in (51.3 m) (gundeck)
- Beam: 45 ft 0 1/2 in (13.7 m)
- Depth of hold: 20 ft 7 in (6.27 m)
- Propulsion: Sails
- Sail plan: Full-rigged ship
- Armament: 64 guns of various weights of shot

Belleisle was the French East Indiaman Bertin, launched in 1760 that the British Royal Navy captured in 1761 and commissioned as the third rate HMS Belleisle.

== Capture ==
HMS Hero and HMS Venus captured Bertin on 3 April 1761 and sent her into Plymouth. There the Royal Navy purchased her. (The prize crew from Hero shared in the proceeds of Venus and Hero's capture of the French privateer Lyon on 6 April 1761.)

== Career ==
Belleisle was fitted in August 1761 and fitted in 1762. She shared in the prize money awarded to the British squadron that captured the French East Indiaman St Priest on 11 March 1762. Belleisle was paid off in July 1763.

She was fitted as a guard ship at Plymouth in January 1764, and then as a troopship in May 1765 and again in March 1768. Between March 1771 and April 1772 she underwent a small to middling repair at Plymouth.

Between August 1776 and January 1777, she again underwent fitting as a guard ship. She was refitted between December 1777 and February 1778. She twice underwent fitting at Plymouth for the East Indies in April to June 1778 and in February 1779.

Between March and June 1772 she was at Chatham, receiving an all-carronade armament and the masts of a 60-gun ship. She was paid off in March 1783.

== Fate ==
Belleisle was converted to a lazarette between August and December 1784. She was later transferred to Customs and struck from the Navy List. She was sold on 3 February 1819.
