= Aenesidemus (book) =

1792 book by Gottlob Ernst Schulze

Aenesidemus is a German book published anonymously by Gottlob Ernst Schulze (University of Helmstedt) in 1792. Schulze attempted to refute the principles that Karl Leonhard Reinhold established in support of Immanuel Kant's Critique of Pure Reason (1781). The title is a reference to Aenesidemus, an ancient Greek Pyrrhonist philosopher. Its complete title, in English translation, was Aenesidemus or Concerning the Foundations of the Philosophy of the Elements Issued by Professor Reinhold in Jena Together with a Defense of Skepticism against the Pretensions of the Critique of Reason (German: Aenesidemus oder über die Fundamente der von dem Herrn Professor Reinhold in Jena gelieferten Elementar-Philosophie. Nebst einer Vertheidigung des Skepticismus gegen die Anmassungen der Vernunftkritik).

== Summary ==
The book was supposed to be a written correspondence between Hermias (Greek: "a follower of Hermes"), who believes in the Kantian critical philosophy, and Aenesidemus (Greek: "he who praises the people"), who is skeptical about that philosophy. David Hume's skepticism about induction, according to this book, was not disproved by Kant. As Hume had asserted, the existence of causality, the soul, or the thing-in-itself cannot be proved.

== Schulze's skepticism ==
Philosophy cannot establish the existence or non-existence of the thing-in-itself. By establishing general principles, we can't know the limits of our ability to know. Progressive development, however, can approach complete knowledge.

No skeptic can doubt the reality and certainty of mental representations and mental events that are immediately given through consciousness.

Skepticism doubts the possibility of knowledge about the existence or non-existence of the thing-in-itself. Kant, however, was guilty of begging the question in that he presupposed that the thing-in-itself exists and causally interacts with observing subjects.

Kant and Reinhold claimed that the reality of objects can be known from the representations in the mind of the observing subject. This is inferring objective reality from subjective thought. Such an inference is the fallacy of drawing existential conclusions from logical premises.

Kant's critical philosophy is self-contradictory. He said that things-in-themselves cause sensations in an observer's mind. Kant applied causality to noumena. But, in his critique, he had claimed that causality is a category of the understanding that can only be applied to phenomena.

Kant posited real existence to the postulates of God, Free Will, and Immortal Souls. But this is more than is necessary for moral theology, which only requires belief in them as Ideas of Reason.

The science of psychology does not require that the soul have faculties. Rather, psychology is a detailed description and systematic classification of actual mental events.

If we were to take critical philosophy seriously, we would commit ourselves to resolving experiences into two parts — a system of universal subjective forms on one side, and a mass of amorphous, meaningless objective matter on the other.

How can we be sure that Kant's obligation to be moral is the result of freedom? It might be the result of some irrational natural force.

== Reactions ==
Kant's response was indicated in his letter to Jakob Sigismund Beck, December 4, 1792:

"Under the assumed name of Aenesidemus, an even wider skepticism has been advanced, namely, that we cannot know at all whether our representations correspond to anything else (as object), which is as much as to say: whether a representation is a representation (stands for anything). For 'representation' means a determination in us that we relate to something else (whose place the representation takes in us)..."

Reinhold wrote that true skepticism rested on the fact that only the observing subject felt what was in its consciousness. The only truth is the subject's notion that there is an object that agrees with its internal mental representation.

Johann Gottlieb Fichte agreed with Reinhold's subjectivity. He based his own idealism on the observing subject's internal forms of knowledge. Arthur Schopenhauer agreed with Schulze: ["Therefore the world as [REPRESENTATION], in which aspect alone we are here considering it, has two essential, necessary, and inseparable halves. The one half is the object, whose forms are space and time, and through these plurality. But the other half, the subject, does not lie in space and time, for it is whole and undivided in every representing being. Hence a single one of these beings with the object completes the world as representation just as fully as do the millions that exist. And if that single one were to disappear, then the world as representation would no longer exist. Therefore these halves are inseparable even in thought, for each of the two has meaning and existence only through and for the other; each exists with the other and vanishes with it."].
