= James Winston (thespian) =

English strolling player and theatre manager

James Winston

James Winston (1773–1843) was an English strolling player and theatre manager, who ran the Theatre Royal Drury Lane for seven years. He was the first secretary of the Garrick Club, fulfilling the role from 1831 until his death in 1842.

His published writings include volumes of Diaries and the historically valuable The Theatric Tourist (1805).
