= Gottlob Ernst Schulze =

German philosopher (1761–1833)

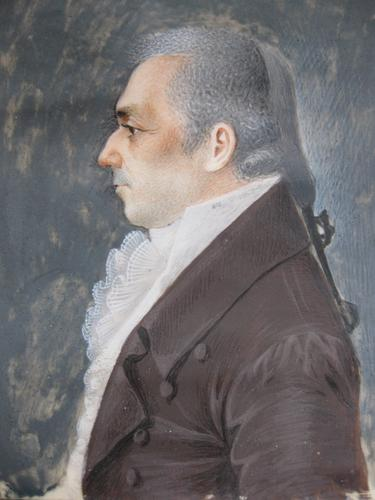
- Born: 23 August 1761; Heldrungen, Electorate of Saxony, Holy Roman Empire
- Died: 14 January 1833 (aged 71); Göttingen, Kingdom of Hanover, German Confederation
- Relatives: Ernst Schulze (grandson)

Education
- Education: University of Wittenberg
- Academic advisor: Franz Volkmar Reinhard

Philosophical work
- Era: 18th-century philosophy
- Region: Western philosophy
- School: German idealism German skepticism
- Institutions: University of Wittenberg; University of Helmstedt; University of Göttingen
- Notable students: Arthur Schopenhauer
- Main interests: Epistemology
- Notable works: Aenesidemus (1792)
- Notable ideas: Hume's skepticism about induction not disproven by Kant's Critique of Pure Reason

Gottlob Ernst Schulze (German: [ˈʃʊltsə]; 23 August 1761 – 14 January 1833) was a German philosopher. He was the grandfather of the pioneering biochemist Ernst Schulze.

== Biography ==
Schulze was born in Heldrungen in the Electorate of Saxony (modern-day Thuringia, Germany). He was a professor at Wittenberg, Helmstedt, and Göttingen. His most influential book was Aenesidemus (1792), a skeptical polemic against Immanuel Kant's Critique of Pure Reason and Karl Leonhard Reinhold's Elementary Philosophy.

In Göttingen, he advised his student Arthur Schopenhauer to concentrate on the philosophies of Plato and Kant. This advice had a strong influence on Schopenhauer's philosophy. In the winter semester of 1810 and 1811, Schopenhauer studied both psychology and metaphysics under Schulze.

Schulze died in Göttingen on January 14, 1833.

== Quotes ==
- "As determined by the Critique of Pure Reason, the function of the principle of causality thus undercuts all philosophizing about the where or how of the origin of our cognitions. All assertions on the matter, and every conclusion drawn from them, become empty subtleties, for once we accept that determination of the principle as our rule of thought, we could never ask, "Does anything actually exist which is the ground and cause of our representations?". We can only ask, "How must the understanding join these representations together, in keeping with the pre-determined functions of its activity, in order to gather them as one experience?"

== Works ==
- Grundriß der philosophischen Wissenschaften (Wittenberg and Zerbst, Vol. 1 1788, Vol. 2 1790).
- Aenesidemus oder über die Fundamente der von dem Herrn Professor Reinhold in Jena gelieferten Elementar-Philosophie. Nebst einer Vertheidigung des Skepticismus gegen die Anmassungen der Vernunftkritik (1792).
- Kritik der theoretischen Philosophie (two volumes, Hamburg, 1801).
- Grundsätze der allgemeinen Logik (Helmstedt, 1802).
- Encyclopädie der philosophischen Wissenschaften zum Gebrauche für seine Vorlesungen (Göttingen, 1814).
- Psychische Anthropologie (two volumes, Göttingen, 1816).
- Philosophische Tugendlehre (Göttingen, 1817).
- Über die menschliche Erkenntnis (Göttingen, 1832).

== See also ==
- Friedrich Heinrich Jacobi
- Salomon Maimon
- Karl Leonhard Reinhold
