= Marcus Flaminius =

1792 novel

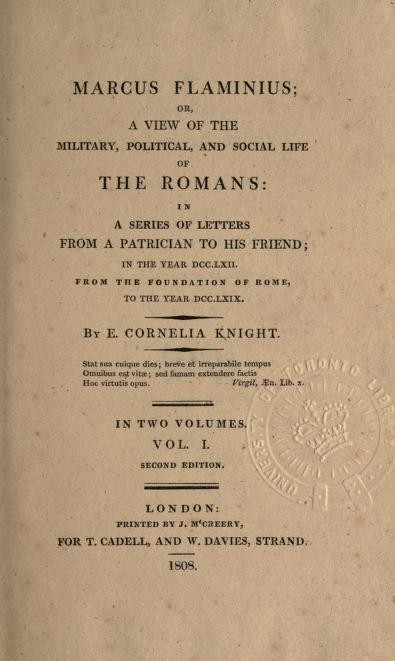
- Author: Cornelia Knight
- Language: English
- Genre: Historical
- Publisher: Charles Dilly
- Publication date: 1792
- Publication place: United Kingdom
- Media type: Print

Marcus Flaminius is a 1792 historical novel by the British writer Cornelia Knight. It drew on Knight's classical learning and was dedicated to Horace Walpole. Taking the form of a epistolary novel it depicts a Roman soldier Marcus Flaminius captured by the Germanic forces at the Battle of the Teutoburg Forest. After spending several years as a prisoner and outsider amongst the Cherusci, he then returns to the corrupt Rome of Emperor Tiberius. Knight uses the novel to reflect indirectly on the recent French Revolution.

== Bibliography ==
- Looser, Devoney (ed.) The Cambridge Companion to Women's Writing in the Romantic Period. Cambridge University Press, 2015.
- Mitchell, Kate. Reading Historical Fiction: The Revenant and Remembered Past. Springer, 2012.
- O'Brien, Karen. Women and Enlightenment in Eighteenth-Century Britain. Cambridge University Press, 2009.
