= Henry James Pye =

English Poet Laureate (1745–1813)

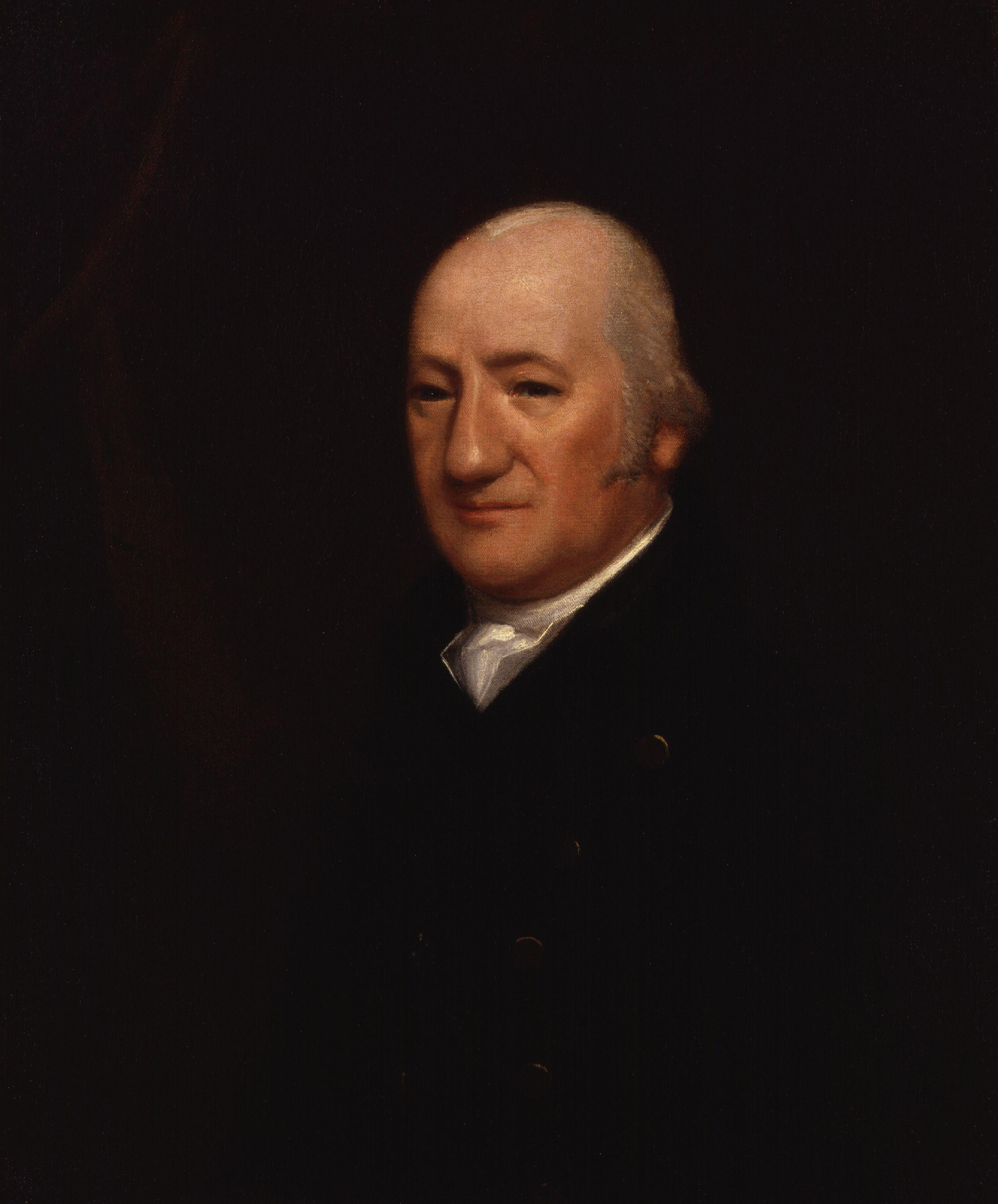
- Henry James Pye, circa 1800-1808.

Poet Laureate of the United Kingdom
- In office 28 July 1790 – 11 August 1813
- Monarch: George III
- Preceded by: Thomas Warton
- Succeeded by: Robert Southey

Personal details
- Born: 20 February 1745 Faringdon, Berkshire, England
- Died: 11 August 1813 (aged 68) Pinner, Middlesex, England
- Resting place: Pinner's parish church of St John the Baptist
- Spouse: Martha Corbett (1801–1813) his death
- Children: Harry James Pye
- Education: Magdalen College, Oxford
- Occupation: Poet Laureate

Henry James Pye (/paɪ/; 20 February 1745 – 11 August 1813) was an English poet, and Poet Laureate from 1790 until his death. His appointment as laureate owed nothing to poetic achievement and may have been awarded to him as compensation for the loss of his seat in Parliament. Pye was a competent prose writer who fancied himself as a poet, earning the derisive label of poetaster.

== Life ==
Pye was born in London, the son of Henry Pye of Faringdon House in Berkshire, and his wife, Mary James. He was the nephew of Admiral Thomas Pye. He was educated at Magdalen College, Oxford. His father died in 1766, leaving him a legacy of debt amounting to £50,000, and the burning of the family home further increased his difficulties.

In 1784 he was elected Member of Parliament for Berkshire. During his service, "his only known vote" was in favour of Pitt on the Regency Bill. He retired from Parliament in 1790, the expenses associated with his election and parliamentary attendance having forced him to sell the paternal estate. He became a police magistrate for Westminster. Although he had no command of language and was destitute of poetic feeling, his ambition was to obtain recognition as a poet, and he published many volumes of verse.

In 1790 he was named poet laureate by Pitt after Pitt's first choice, William Hayley, declined the honour. According to Kenneth Hopkins, Pitt probably regarded Pye as a "safe, unambitious writer who could be relied upon to say the right thing twice a year", and awarded him the laureateship to compensate him for the loss of his Parliamentary seat. The appointment was looked on as ridiculous, and his birthday odes were a continual source of contempt. The 20th-century British historian Lord Blake called Pye "the worst Poet Laureate in English history with the possible exception of Alfred Austin". Indeed, Pye's successor, Robert Southey, wrote in 1814: "I have been rhyming as doggedly and dully as if my name had been Henry James Pye." He was the first poet laureate to receive a fixed salary of £270 instead of the historic tierce of Canary wine. After his death, Pye remained one of the unfortunates who have been classified as a "poetaster".

As a prose writer, Pye was far from contemptible. He had a fancy for commentaries and summaries. Of all he wrote, his prose Summary of the Duties of a Justice of the Peace out of Sessions (1808) is most worthy of record. His "Commentary on Shakespeare's commentators", and that appended to his translation of the Poetics, contain some noteworthy matter. A man, who, born in 1745, could write "Sir Charles Grandison is a much more unnatural character than Caliban," may have been a poetaster but was certainly not a fool.

He died in Pinner, Middlesex on 11 August 1813. He is buried in Pinner's parish church of St John the Baptist.

Pye married twice. He had two daughters by his first wife. He married secondly in 1801 Martha Corbett, by whom he had a son, Henry John Pye, who in 1833 inherited the Clifton Hall, Staffordshire estate of a distant cousin and who was High Sheriff of Staffordshire in 1840.

== Works ==
- Prose

- Summary of the Duties of a Justice of the Peace out of Sessions (1808)
- The Democrat (1795)
- The Aristocrat (1799)

- Poetry

- Poems on Various Subjects (1787), first substantial collection of Pye's verse
- Adelaide: a Tragedy in Five Acts (1800)
- Alfred: An Epic Poem in Six Books (1801)

- Translations

- Aristotle's Poetics (1792)

- Plays

- The Siege of Meaux (1794)
- Adelaide (1800)
- A Prior Claim (1805)

== Notes ==
Parliament of Great Britain
Preceded by John Elwes (politician); Winchcombe Henry Hartley	Member for Berkshire; 1784–1790 with George Vansittart	Succeeded by George Vansittart; Winchcombe Henry Hartley
Court offices
Preceded by Thomas Warton	British Poet Laureate; 1790–1813	Succeeded by Robert Southey
