= Theatre Royal, Dumfries =

Theatre in Dumfries, Scotland

Coordinates: 55.068143°N 3.607635°W

Theatre Royal
- Interactive map of Theatre Royal
- Address: Shakespeare Street; Dumfries; Scotland
- Owner: Guild of Players
- Designation: Listed Building Category B

Construction
- Opened: 29 September 1792

The Theatre Royal in Dumfries, Scotland is the oldest working theatre in Scotland. The theatre is owned by the Guild of Players who bought it in 1959, thereby saving it from demolition. The Guild's aim is to promote the tradition of live theatre in Dumfries. It is the venue for the Guild of Players' own productions and for performances from visiting companies. In addition it is used extensively as a venue for the Dumfries and Galloway Arts Festival, the Dumfries Music Festival and the Dumfries Musical Theatre Company.

== History ==
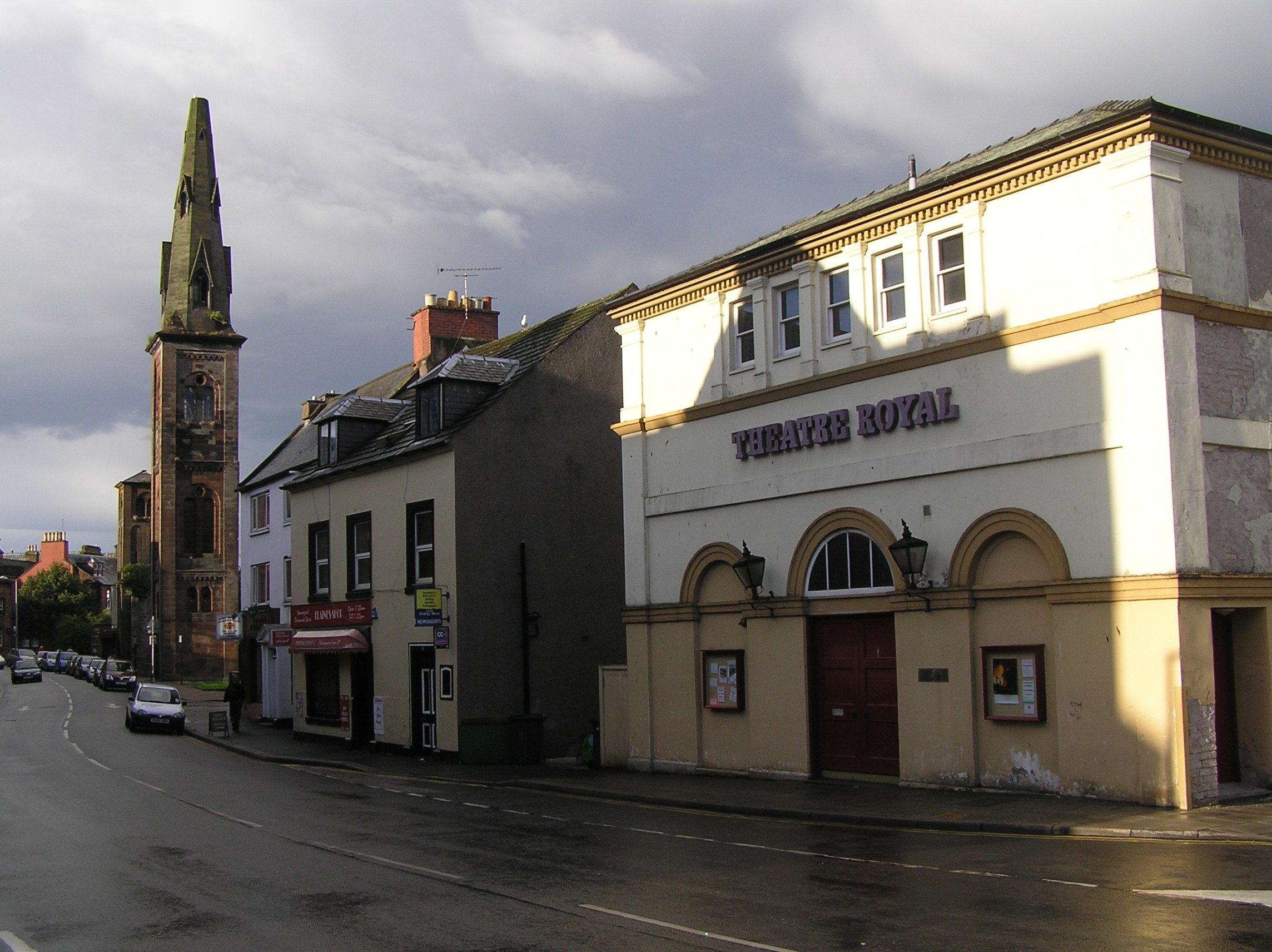
The Theatre Royal in Dumfries

In 1790, actor manager George Stephen Sutherland approached interested people in Dumfries and the surrounding area with the intention of raising subscriptions for a purpose-built theatre, to take the place of the Old Assembly Room in the George Hotel.. Among those involved was Robert Burns, then resident at Ellisland Farm, a few miles to the north of Dumfries. Robert Burns, writing from Ellisland to his friend William Nicol, on 2 February 1790, said:

'Our theatrical company, of which you must have heard, leave us this week. Their merit and character are indeed very great, both on stage and in private life, not a worthless creature among them; and their encouragement has been accordingly. Their usual run is from eighteen to twenty pounds a night; seldom less than the one, and the house will hold no more than the other. There have been instances of sending away six and eight and ten pounds a night for want of room. A new theatre is to be built by subscription; the first stone is to be laid on Friday first to come. Three hundred guineas have been raised by thirty subscribers, and thirty more might have been got if wanted. The manager, Mr Sutherland, was introduced to me by a friend from Ayr; and a worthier or cleverer fellow I have rarely met with.'

Sutherland was also a lessee of the Tontine Assembly Rooms, Paisley and had tried to build a theatre in Ayr.

Completed at a cost of £800, what was then known simply as The Theatre or the New Theatre, opened on Saturday 29 September 1792, under the management of Sutherland's partner, John Brown Williamson, from the Theatre Royal Haymarket. With a design by architect Thomas Boyd of Dumfries, based on that of the Theatre Royal in Bristol, it seated between five and six hundred. Williamson married Louisa Fontenelle, an actress in the theatre company, and with whom Burns corresponded sending her a poem and two prologues; they emigrated to America where he became manager of a theatre in Boston, MA.

The first reference to the theatre under its present name is to be found in an advertisement in the "Dumfries and Galloway Courier" in 1811. One of the early lessees was John Henry Alexander from Dunbar who moved on to Glasgow to lease, then buy, the Theatre Royal, Dunlop Street in the city. J.H. Robb of the Theatre Royal, Dundee was a lessee in the 1860s.

Improvement of the stage in 1830 and a radical renovation was carried out when the theatre was owned by William Mackie of Moat House, Dumfries in 1876 by architect Charles J. Phipps, who had worked on the Gaiety in London and the Theatre Royal, Edinburgh, which increased the seating capacity to over a thousand, enhanced the amenity of the theatre for players and patrons. A vivid description of a benefit performance in the latter years of the nineteenth century is to be found in "The Greenwood Hat" by J. M. Barrie, who spent some years of his youth in Dumfries and was a keen member of the Theatre Royal's audience.

In 1902, early forms of moving pictures began following their introduction at the Paris Exhibition. This combination of moving pictures, 'movies' and music hall acts in a mixed programme, proved successful until 1909 when the theatre was purchased by P. Stobie & Son, who installed a flat maple floor to take advantage of the late Victorian craze for roller skating. It seems to have been too late in the day for a Roller Skating Rink for County Ladies and Gentlemen, for the theatre took on a new identity as 'The Electric Theatre' and continued to play an important part in the development of cinema. The 'Auld Hippie' or 'The Scratch' as it was affectionately known succumbed to the competition of television and closed in October 1954.

Acquisition of the theatre by the Guild of Players in 1959, at a time when demolition seemed a likely prospect, was followed by an eighteen-month period of reconstruction and a formal opening by Sir Compton Mackenzie, whose mother's company, "The Compton Comedy Company" had been the last of the touring troupes to perform there. The first Guild production mounted in the theatre in October 1960 was "What Every woman Knows" by J.M. Barrie.

The theatre has been further renovated and extended in the 21st century, with the help of a grant from The Holywood Trust, and reopened in December 2015.

== Programme ==
In addition to the Guild's own annual programme of five plays and the Christmas pantomime, it hosts productions by Dumfries Musical and Operatic Society and the Junior Guild as well as professional touring companies, among them Scottish Opera and Scottish Ballet.
