= Cornelia Knight =

English gentlewoman, traveller, landscape artist and writer (1757–1837)

Ellis Cornelia Knight
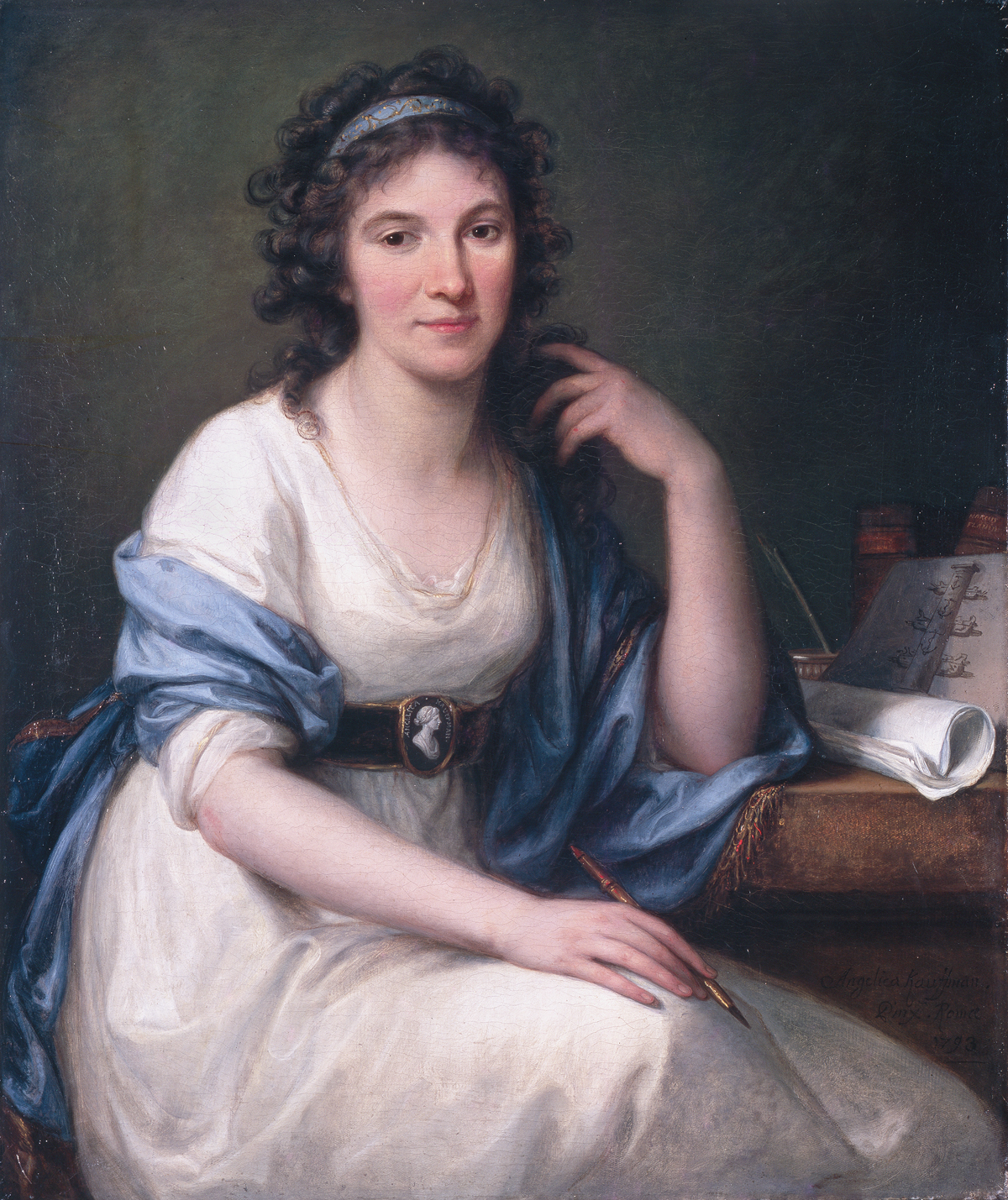
- Portrait of Ellis Cornelia Knight, by Angelica Kauffmann, 1793, Manchester Art Gallery
- Born: 27 March 1757; Westminster, England
- Died: 18 December 1837 (aged 80); Paris, France
- Known for: Lady Companion to Princess Charlotte of Wales
- Notable work: Dinarbas, Autobiography

Ellis Cornelia Knight (27 March 1757 – 18 December 1837) was an English gentlewoman, traveller, landscape artist, and writer of novels, verse, journals, and history. She had the acquaintance of many prominent figures in her lifetime, from members of the circle of Samuel Johnson and Sir Joshua Reynolds in her girlhood; Cardinal de Bernis, Sir William and Lady Emma Hamilton, and Lord Horatio Nelson during her Italian sojourn; and members of the British Royal Family during her service to Queen Charlotte and Princess Charlotte Augusta of Wales. She corresponded with or met other writers of her time including Frances Burney, Germaine de Staël, Lady Charlotte Bury, and Jane Porter.

== Biography ==
Knight's father was Sir Joseph Knight, a career Royal Navy officer knighted by King George III, who attained the rank of Rear Admiral of the White. Her mother Philippina Deane was his second wife. She was carefully educated, and taught to dance by Augustin Noverre.

Upon her father's death in 1775, Knight and her mother were left with only a small income and no pension, inducing them to leave for the Continent in 1776, where they settled in Italy. In 1790, Cornelia anonymously published Dinarbas, a continuation of Johnson's Rasselas in which Rasselas becomes ruler of Abyssinia, marries, and finds happiness. Following its success, she published Marcus Flaminius in 1792, a historical epistolary novel. The Knights were living in Naples in 1798 when word came of Nelson's victory at the Battle of the Nile. They participated in the ecstatic celebrations of that victory when Nelson arrived in Naples, and became good friends of the Hamiltons and Lord Nelson.

After her mother died in 1799, Knight was invited to accompany the Hamiltons and Lord Nelson on their return journey to England. During this trip she became increasingly uneasy about the warmth of the relationship between Lady Hamilton and Lord Nelson, though she also witnessed her ode to Nelson on the Battle of the Nile sung by Emma with a musical setting by Joseph Haydn. Once back in England, Knight settled independently, writing and making frequent visit to friends. She was appointed companion to Queen Charlotte (1805) and to a similar position, later, in the household of Princess Charlotte Augusta of Wales (1813).

In 1805 her reputation as a learned author of highly respectable character earned her an invitation to join the household of Queen Charlotte. Knight was with the Queen as the King's mental capacity declined and a Regency was established. In 1812 she became Companion to Princess Charlotte Augusta of Wales, holding this post until the Regent fired her in 1814 for imagined lapses of judgement.

In 1818 she became a teacher of English, literature, science and fine arts to the young Massimo Taparelli, the Marquis d'Azeglio, who was an important Italian writer, painter, patriot and politic. He mentioned Cornelia in his d'Azeglio's Memoirs (1867), in chapter XIV where d'Azeglio met Knight in 1818 at Castelgandolfo. The last twenty years of her life were spent outside England, and she died in Paris.

== Works ==
Knight published five works in her lifetime:

- Dinarbas (1790), a continuation of Samuel Johnson's Rasselas
- Marcus Flaminius: a view of the military, political, and social life of the Romans in a series of letters from a patrician to his friend (1792), a romantic epistolary novel set in ancient Rome during the reign of the emperor Tiberius.
- A Description of Latium, or La Campagna di Roma (1805), with her own etchings
- Translations from the German in Prose and Verse (1812)
- Sir Guy de Lusignan, a Romance (1833)

At her death she left behind an incomplete autobiography and a journal. Her autobiography is a most valuable source of information for the court history of those days. The most important statements in the work were edited and published posthumously in 1861.
