= Richmond Theatre (Surrey) =

Theatre in Surrey, England

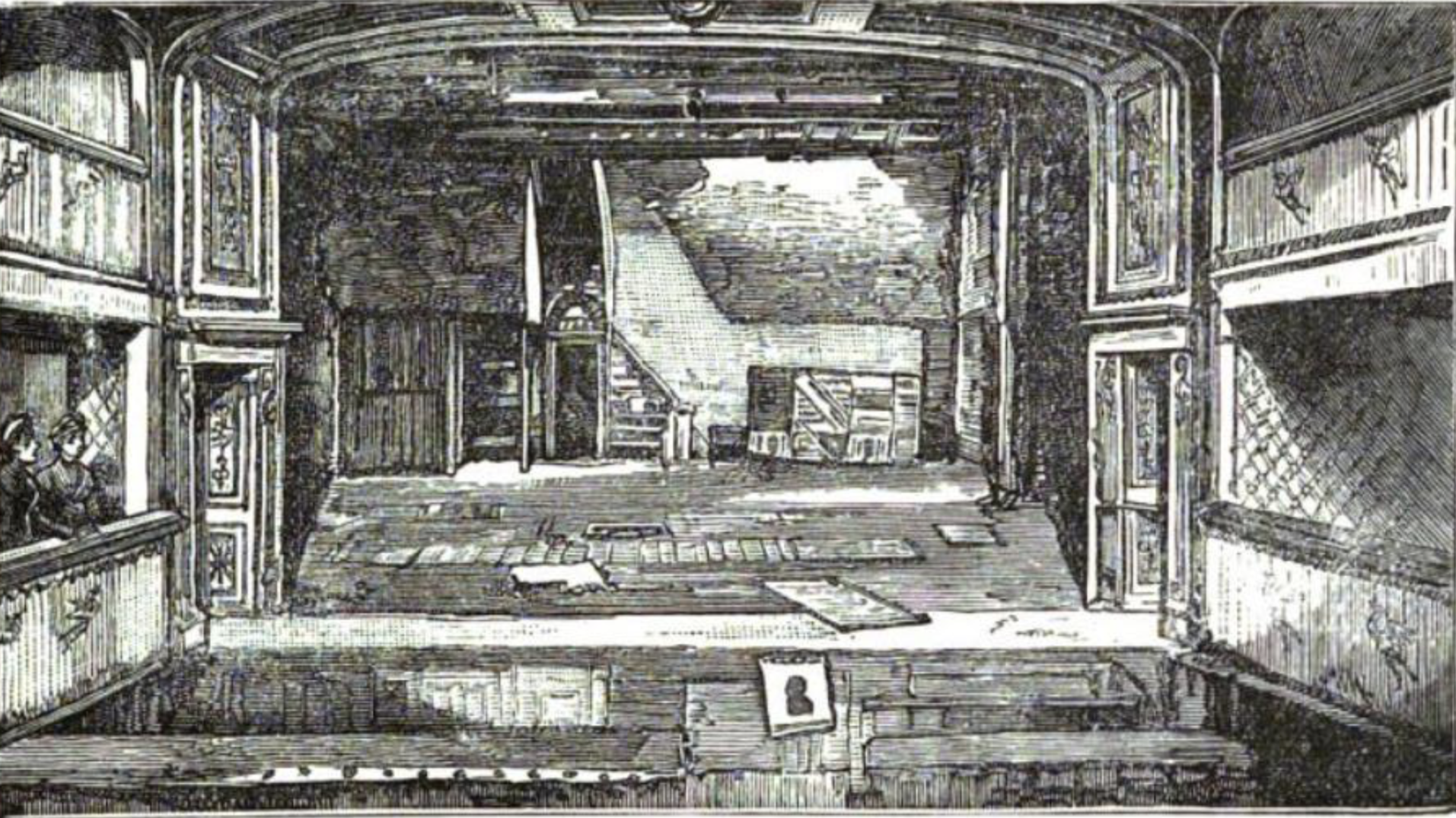
Sketch of the interior of the Richmond Theatre

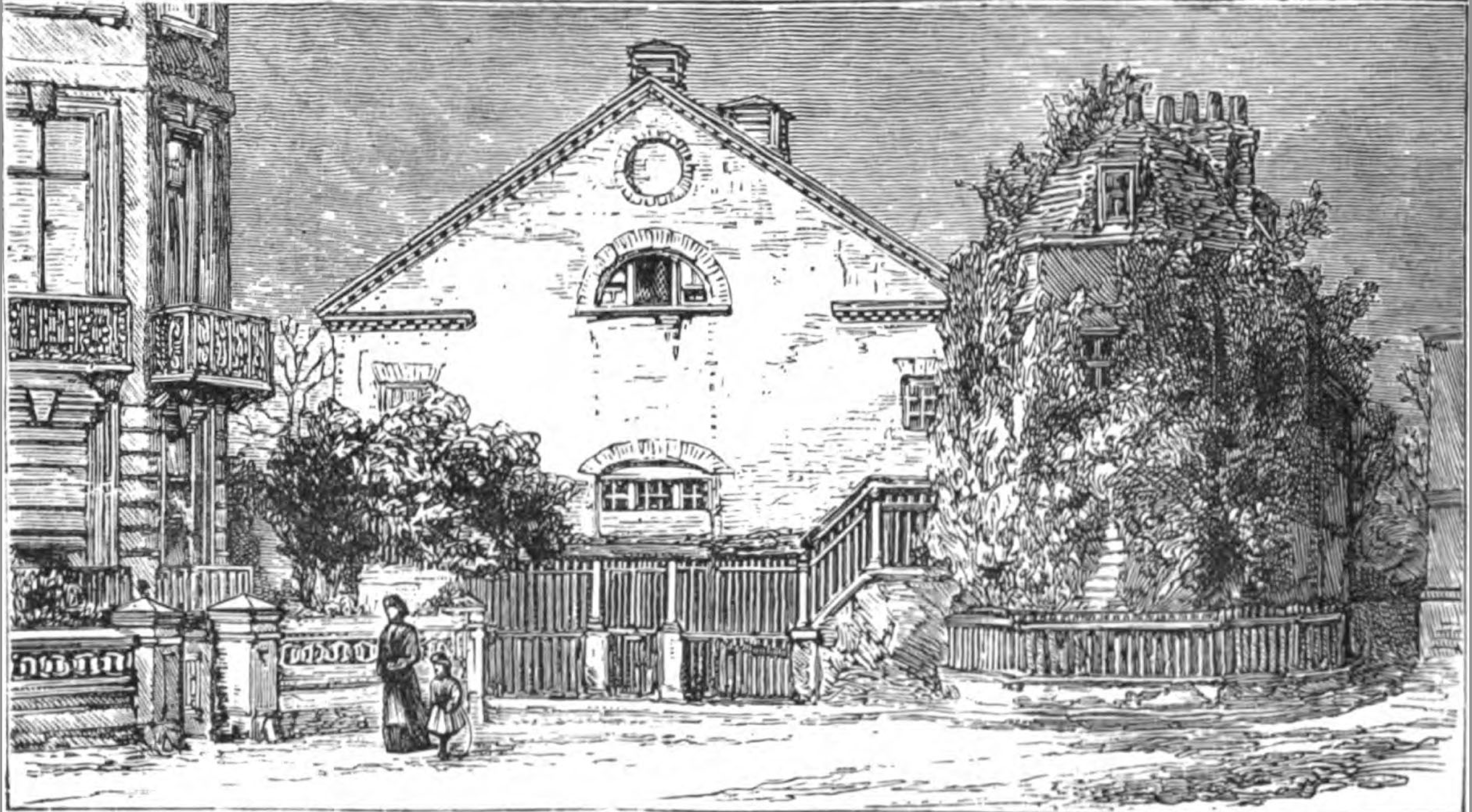
Exterior of the Richmond Theatre and Edmund Kean's House. Kean was manager of the Richmond Theatre from 1831 until his death in 1833.

The Richmond Theatre was a theatre located in Richmond, Surrey, England. It was built in 1765 under the supervision of David Garrick. It was one of Surrey's major theatres for nearly 120 years. The theatre was originally named The New Theatre on Richmond Greene and opened on 15 June 1765. The actor Edmund Kean was manager of the theatre from 1831 until his death in 1833. Its management changed hands several times before the theatre was finally demolished in 1884.
