= Break, Break, Break =

1842 poem by Alfred, Lord Tennyson

- by Alfred, Lord Tennyson
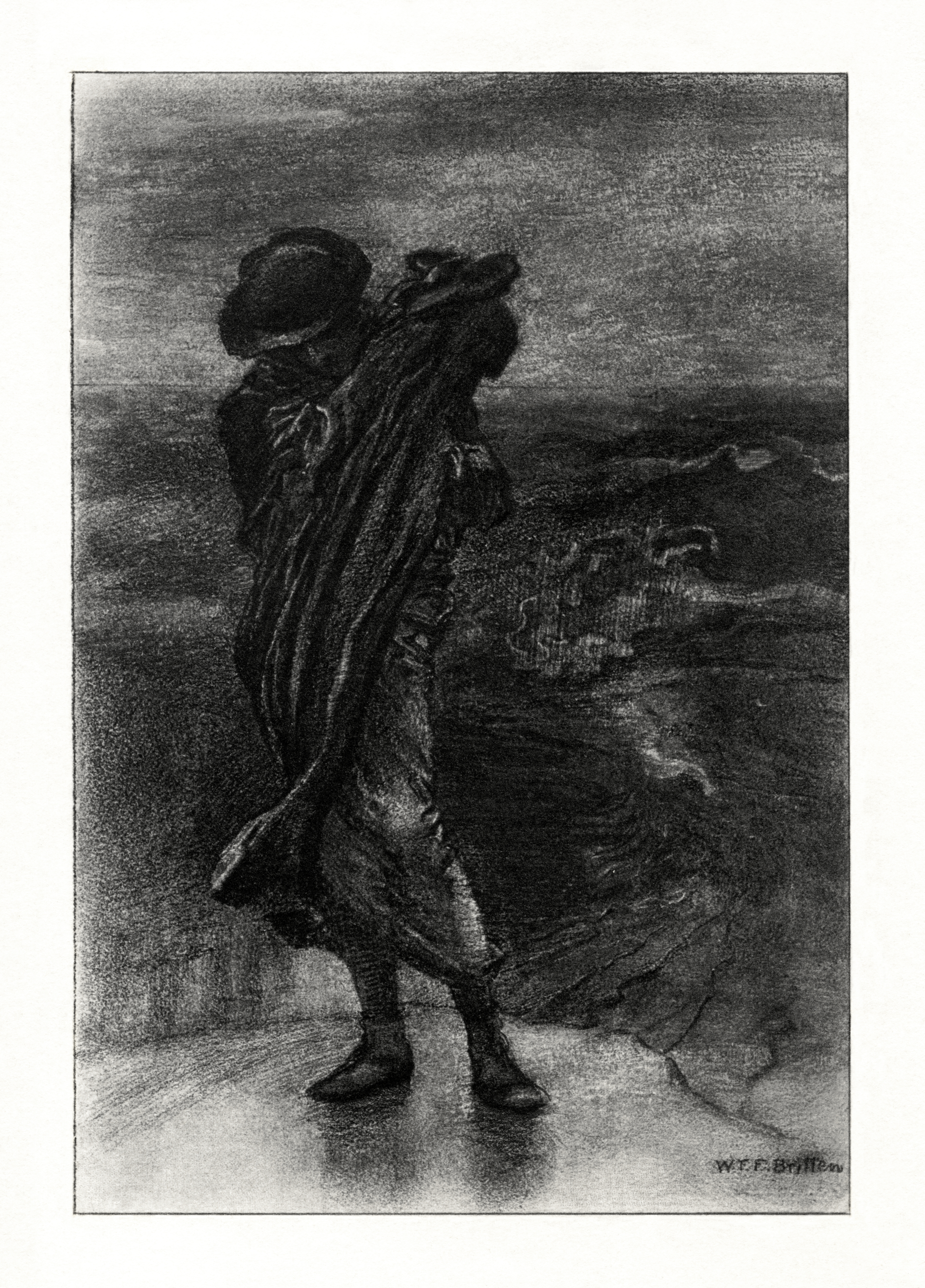
- c. 1901 illustration to the poem by W. E. F. Britten
- Written: early 1835
- First published in: 1842
- Country: United Kingdom
- Language: English
- Subject(s): Death of Arthur Hallam
- Genre(s): elegy
- Meter: irregular trimeter
- Rhyme scheme: abcb defe ...
- Lines: 16

Full text
- Break, Break, Break at Wikisource

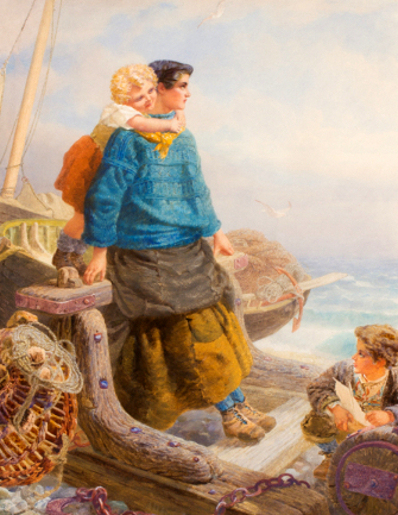
Break, Break, Break, On The Cold Grey Stones O Sea…, watercolour by Alfred Downing Fripp

"Break, Break, Break" is a poem by Alfred, Lord Tennyson written during early 1835 and published in 1842. The poem is an elegy that describes Tennyson's feelings of loss after Arthur Henry Hallam died and his feelings of isolation while at Mablethorpe, Lincolnshire.

== Themes ==
The poem describes feelings of loss, spoken by a man standing on the rocky sea shore. It has a strong biographical connection, containing Tennyson's feelings of melancholy and nostalgia. Tennyson captures his strong emotions in other poems, including Morte D' Arthur, "Tithonus", and "Ulysses". The suffering felt within the poem is connected to the suffering described in Tennyson's In Memoriam, in that they both describe longing for Tennyson's deceased friend Hallam. This longing is voiced in the third stanza of "Break, Break, Break".

"Break, Break, Break" can be classified as an elegy on the subject of Tennyson's feelings about Hallam. Like "On a Mourner," written a year before, both poems use a very simple style and describe a scene in minimalistic terms. This technique is later used in later elegies written by Tennyson, including "Crossing the Bar", "In the Garden at Swainston", and "To the Marquess of Dufferin and Ava". In several of his works, including "On a Mourner", Tennyson uses a myth to illustrate themes of the poem. However, this technique and other decorative aspects are dropped in "Break, Break, Break." This distinguishes the poem from other poems Tennyson wrote around the same time, such as "Tithonus" and "Ulysses".

== Critical response ==
Michael Thorn, in his 1992 biography of Tennyson, claims, "This poem, so often anthologized, is a perfect example of how biography can be used to reinvigorate a work grown dull with repetition and familiarity. Almost certainly written during this visit to Mablethorpe [...] knowledge of the biographical background creates a cinematically clear image of the cloaked poet looking resentfully at the cheerful fisherman's child, the equally jovial sailor, and the ships at sea. It is one of the great short lyrics".

== In music ==
Sidney Lanier composed a "setting" for the poem in 1871. In 1906 the composer Cyril Rootham set "Break, break, break" as a part song for unaccompanied men's voices (TTBB) as his Op.17. The work was published in the same year by Weekes & Co using Sol-fa notation.

== Text ==
Break, break, break,
On thy cold gray stones, O Sea!
And I would that my tongue could utter
The thoughts that arise in me.

O, well for the fisherman's boy,
That he shouts with his sister at play!
O, well for the sailor lad,
That he sings in his boat on the bay!

And the stately ships go on
To their haven under the hill;
But O for the touch of a vanish'd hand,
And the sound of a voice that is still!

Break, break, break
At the foot of thy crags, O Sea!
But the tender grace of a day that is dead
Will never come back to me.
