= Tears, Idle Tears =

1847 poem by Alfred, Lord Tennyson

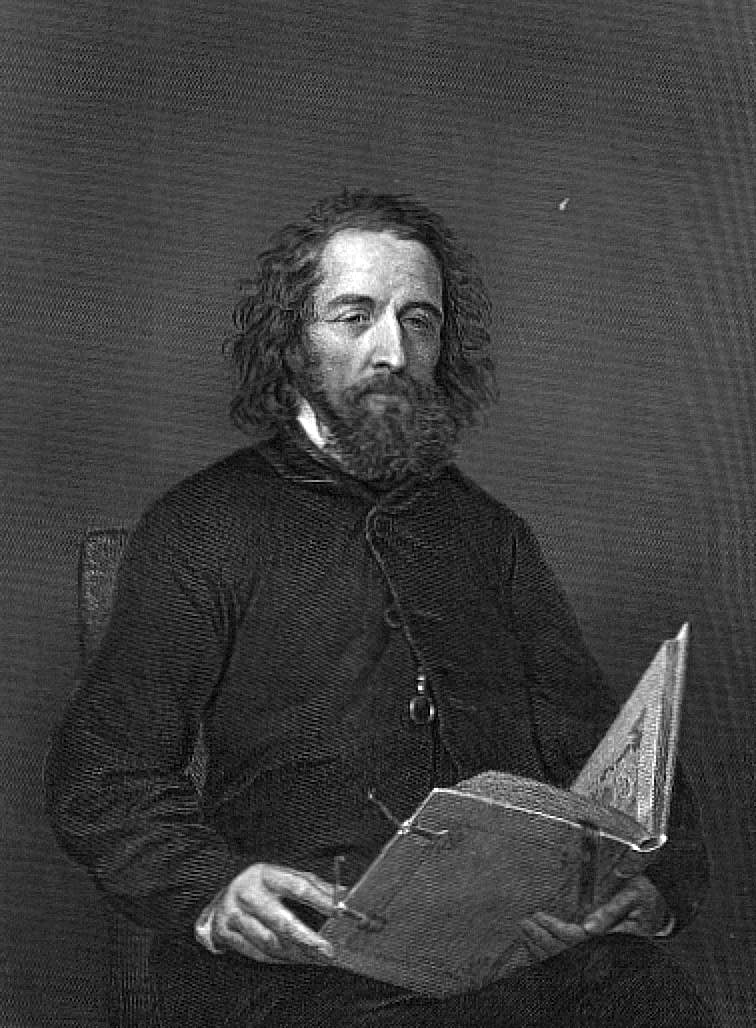
Alfred, Lord Tennyson

"Tears, Idle Tears" is a lyric poem written in 1847 by Alfred, Lord Tennyson (1809–1892), the Victorian-era English poet. Published as one of the "songs" in his The Princess (1847), it is regarded for the quality of its lyrics. A Tennyson anthology describes the poem as "one of the most Virgilian of Tennyson's poems and perhaps his most famous lyric". Readers often overlook the poem's blank verse—the poem does not rhyme.

"Tears, Idle Tears"

Tears, idle tears, I know not what they mean,
Tears from the depth of some divine despair
Rise in the heart, and gather to the eyes,
In looking on the happy autumn-fields,
And thinking of the days that are no more.

Fresh as the first beam glittering on a sail,
That brings our friends up from the underworld,
Sad as the last which reddens over one
That sinks with all we love below the verge;
So sad, so fresh, the days that are no more.

Ah, sad and strange as in dark summer dawns
The earliest pipe of half-awaken'd birds
To dying ears, when unto dying eyes
The casement slowly grows a glimmering square;
So sad, so strange, the days that are no more.

Dear as remembered kisses after death,
And sweet as those by hopeless fancy feign'd
On lips that are for others; deep as love,
Deep as first love, and wild with all regret;
O Death in Life, the days that are no more.

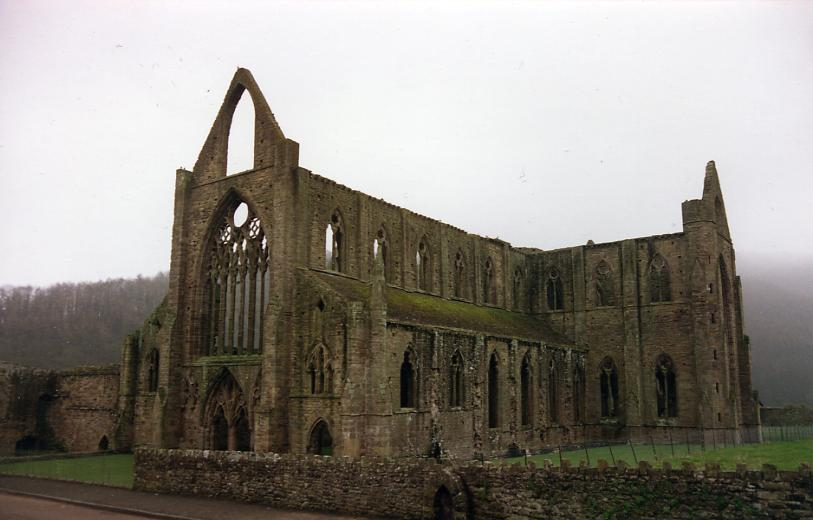
Tintern Abbey inspired the poem. (Additional photos.)

== Analysis ==
Tennyson was inspired to write "Tears, Idle Tears" upon a visit to Tintern Abbey in Monmouthshire, an abbey that was abandoned in 1536. He said the convent was "full for me of its bygone memories", and that the poem was about "the passion of the past, the abiding in the transient." William Wordsworth also wrote a poem inspired by this location in 1798, "Tintern Abbey", which develops a similar theme.

While Tintern Abbey may have prompted the poem, it seems unlikely that its powerful emotion derives only from a generalised feeling for the past. The final stanza in particular strongly suggests Tennyson's unhappy attachment to the lovely Rosa Baring, whose wealthy family lived in Harrington Hall, a short distance from Tennyson's Somersby. Rosa's family evidently disapproved of Rosa's continued relationship with the son of Somersby's alcoholic clergyman, and she ultimately severed the connection. The "kisses . . .by hopeless fancy feign'd/on lips that are for others" and the cri de coeur "Deep as first love, and wild with all regret" seem to have little to do with Tintern Abbey, and much to do with a personal disappointment in love.

== Form ==
"Tears, Idle Tears" is noted for its lyric richness, and for its tones of paradox and ambiguity—especially as Tennyson did not often bring his doubts into the grammar and symbolism of his works. The ambiguity occurs in the contrasting descriptions of the tears: they are "idle", yet come from deep within the narrator; the "happy autumn-fields" inspire sadness. Literary critic Cleanth Brooks writes, "When the poet is able, as in 'Tears, Idle Tears', to analyze his experience, and in the full light of the disparity and even apparent contradiction of the various elements, bring them into a new unity, he secures not only richness and depth but dramatic power as well."

Critic Graham Hough in a 1953 essay asks why the poem is unrhymed, and suggests that something must be "very skillfully put in [rhyme's] place" if many readers do not notice its absence. He concludes that "Tears, Idle Tears" does not rhyme "because it is not about a specific situation, or an emotion with clear boundaries; it is about the great reservoir of undifferentiated regret and sorrow, which you can brush away...but which nevertheless continues to exist". Readers tend not to notice the lack of rhyme because of the richness and variety of the vowel sounds Tennyson employs into the poem. (T. S. Eliot considered Tennyson an unequalled master in handling vowel sounds; see, for example, Tennyson's "Ulysses".) Each line's end-sound—except for the second-last line's "regret"—is an open vowel or a consonant or consonant group that can be drawn out in reading. Each line "trails away, suggesting a passage into some infinite beyond: just as each image is clear and precise, yet is only any instance" of something more universal.

== Set to music ==
The poem, one of the "songs" of The Princess, has been set to music a number of times. Edward Lear put the lyric to music in the 19th century, and Ralph Vaughan Williams' pianistic setting of 1903 was described by The Times as "one of the most beautiful settings in existence of Tennyson's splendid lyric".
