= Alfred, Lord Tennyson =

English poet (1809–1892)

The Right Honourable The Lord Tennyson FRS
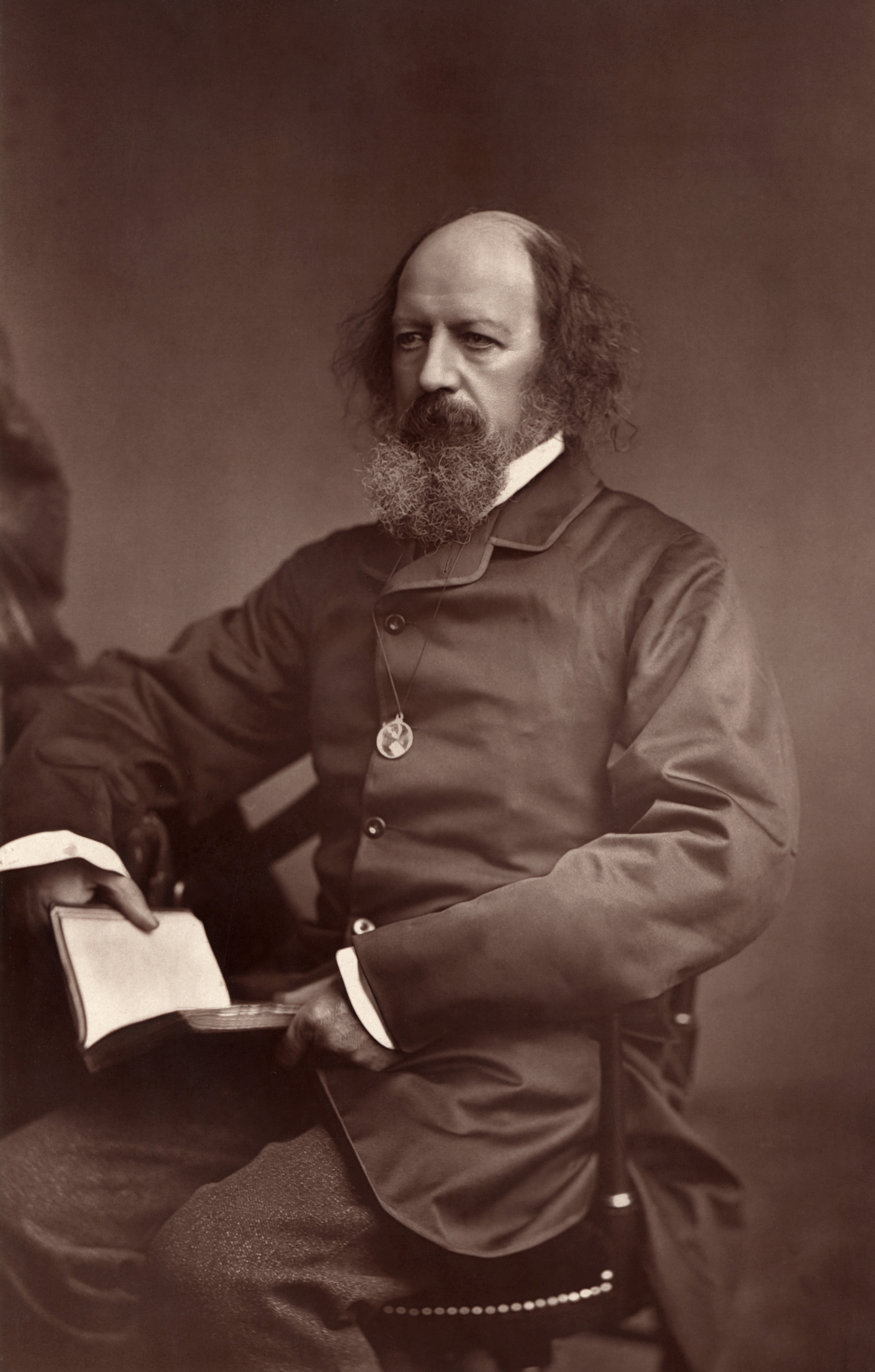
- Tennyson in the late 1860s

Poet Laureate of the United Kingdom
- In office 19 November 1850 – 6 October 1892
- Monarch: Victoria
- Preceded by: William Wordsworth
- Succeeded by: Alfred Austin

Member of the House of Lords Lord Temporal
- In office 11 March 1884 – 6 October 1892; Hereditary peerage
- Succeeded by: Hallam Tennyson, 2nd Baron Tennyson

Personal details
- Born: 6 August 1809 Somersby, Lincolnshire, England
- Died: 6 October 1892 (aged 83) Lurgashall, Sussex, England
- Resting place: Westminster Abbey
- Spouse: Emily Sellwood (m. 1850)
- Relations: George Tennyson (grandfather)
- Children: 2, including Hallam Tennyson, 2nd Baron Tennyson
- Education: Trinity College, Cambridge (no degree)
- Occupation: Poet Laureate (1850–1892)

Alfred Tennyson, 1st Baron Tennyson (/ˈtɛnɪsən/; 6 August 1809 – 6 October 1892) was an English poet. He was Poet Laureate of the United Kingdom during much of Queen Victoria's reign. In 1829 he was awarded the Chancellor's Gold Medal at Cambridge for one of his first pieces, "Timbuktu". He published his first solo collection of poems, Poems, Chiefly Lyrical, in 1830. "Claribel" and "Mariana", which remain some of Tennyson's most celebrated poems, were included in this volume. Some critics described Tennyson as overly sentimental. However, his poems proved popular and brought Tennyson to the attention of well-known writers of the day, including Samuel Taylor Coleridge. Tennyson's early poetry, with its medievalism and powerful visual imagery, was a major influence on the Pre-Raphaelite Brotherhood.

Tennyson also focused on short lyrics, such as "Break, Break, Break", "The Charge of the Light Brigade", "Tears, Idle Tears", and "Crossing the Bar". Much of his verse was based on classical mythological themes, such as "Ulysses" and "The Lotos-Eaters". "In Memoriam A.H.H." was written to commemorate his friend Arthur Hallam, a fellow poet and student at Trinity College, Cambridge, after he died of a stroke at the age of 22. Tennyson also wrote notable blank verse, including Idylls of the King, "Ulysses", and "Tithonus". During his career, Tennyson attempted drama, but his plays enjoyed little success.

A number of phrases from Tennyson's work have become commonplace in the English language, including "Nature, red in tooth and claw" ("In Memoriam A.H.H."), "'Tis better to have loved and lost / Than never to have loved at all", "Theirs not to reason why, / Theirs but to do and die", "My strength is as the strength of ten, / Because my heart is pure", "To strive, to seek, to find, and not to yield", "Knowledge comes, but Wisdom lingers", and "The old order changeth, yielding place to new". He is the ninth most frequently quoted writer in The Oxford Dictionary of Quotations.

== Biography ==
=== Early life ===
Alfred Tennyson was born on 6 August 1809 in Somersby, Lincolnshire, England. He was born into a successful middle-class family of minor landowning status distantly descended from John Savage, 2nd Earl Rivers, and Francis Leke, 1st Earl of Scarsdale.

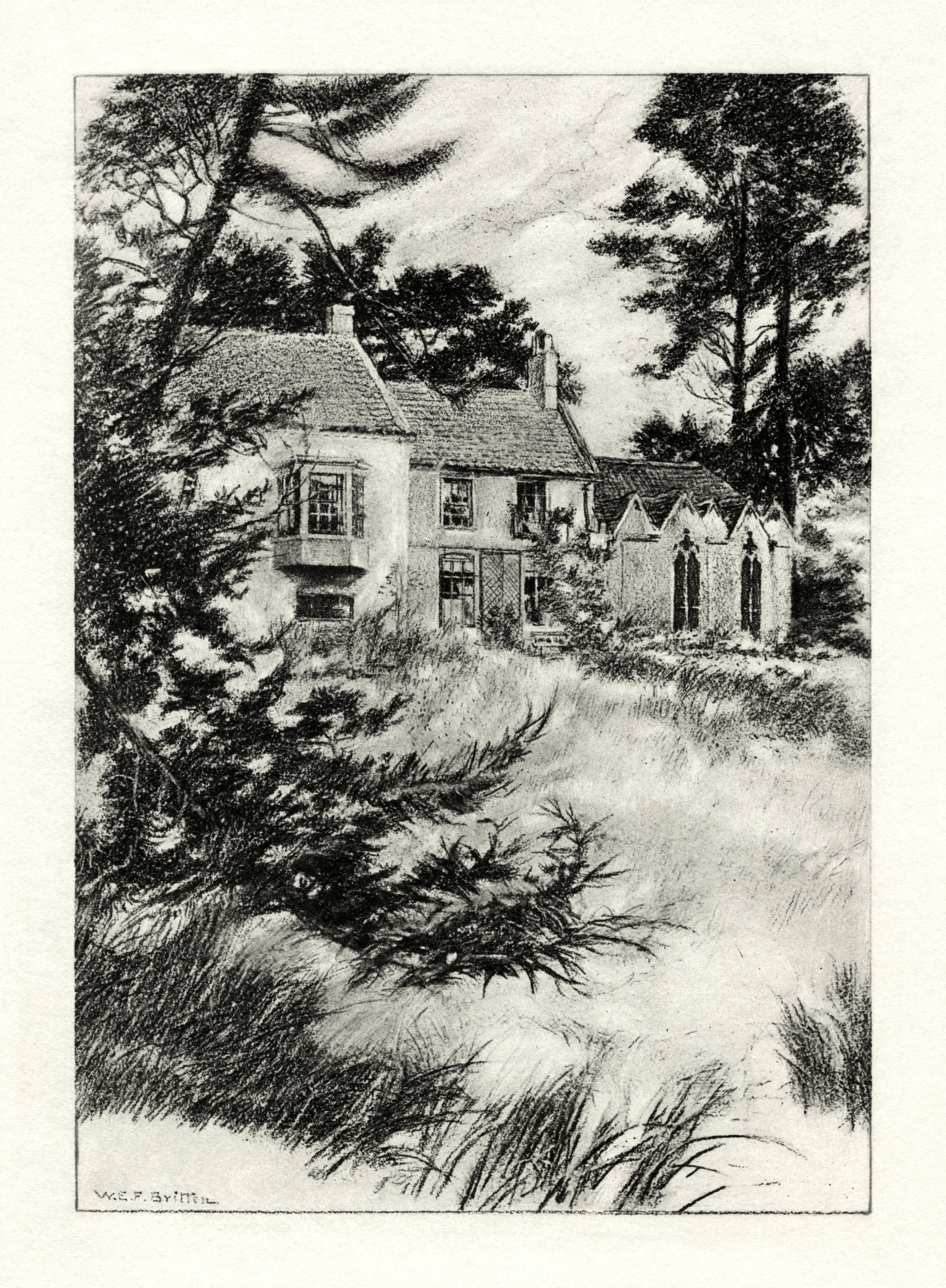
An illustration by William Edward Frank Britten showing Somersby Rectory, where Tennyson was raised and began writing

His father, George Clayton Tennyson, was an Anglican clergyman who served as rector of Somersby (1807–1831), also rector of Benniworth (1802–1831) and Bag Enderby, and vicar of Grimsby (1815). He raised a large family and "was a man of superior abilities and varied attainments, who tried his hand with fair success in architecture, painting, music, and poetry. He was comfortably well off for a country clergyman, and his shrewd money management enabled the family to spend summers at Mablethorpe and Skegness on the eastern coast of England". George Clayton Tennyson was the elder son of the attorney and member of Parliament George Tennyson, of Bayons Manor and Usselby Hall, who had also inherited the estates of his mother's family, the Claytons, and married Mary, daughter and heiress of John Turner, of Caistor, Lincolnshire. George Clayton Tennyson was however pushed into a career in the church and passed over as heir in favour of his younger brother Charles. Their mother, Elizabeth, was the daughter of Stephen Fytche, vicar of St James' Church, Louth (1764), and rector of Withcall (1780), a small village between Horncastle and Louth. Tennyson's father "carefully attended to the education and training of his children".

Tennyson, recalling the poetic influences of his youth, said, "as a boy I was an enormous admirer of Byron." Tennyson and two of his elder brothers were writing poetry in their teens, and a collection of poems by all three was published locally when Alfred was 17. One of those brothers, Charles Tennyson Turner, later married Louisa Sellwood, the younger sister of Alfred's future wife; the other was Frederick Tennyson. Another of Tennyson's brothers, Edward Tennyson, was institutionalised at a private asylum.

The psychologist William James, in his book The Varieties of Religious Experience, quoted Tennyson concerning a type of experience with which Tennyson was familiar:

A kind of waking trance I have frequently had, quite up from boyhood, when I have been all alone. This has often come upon me through repeating my own name. All at once, as it were out of the intensity of the consciousness of individuality, individuality itself seemed to dissolve and fade away into boundless being, and this was not a confused state but the clearest, the surest of the sure, utterly beyond words…

=== Education and first publication ===
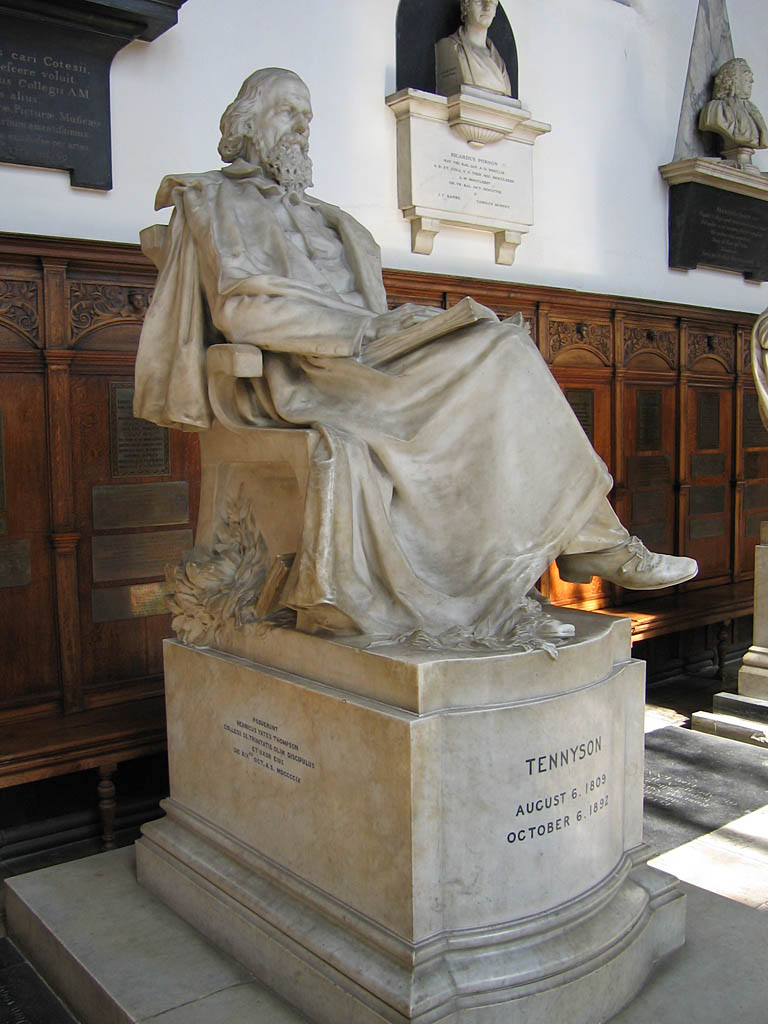
Statue of Lord Tennyson in the chapel of Trinity College, Cambridge

Tennyson was a student of King Edward VI Grammar School, Louth, from 1816 to 1820. He entered Trinity College, Cambridge, in 1827, where he joined a secret society called the Cambridge Apostles. A portrait of Tennyson by George Frederic Watts is in Trinity's collection.

At Cambridge, he met Arthur Hallam and William Henry Brookfield, who became his closest friends. His first publication was a collection of "his boyish rhymes and those of his elder brother Charles" entitled Poems by Two Brothers, published in 1827.

In 1829, Tennyson was awarded the Chancellor's Gold Medal at Cambridge for one of his first pieces, "Timbuktu". Reportedly, "it was thought to be no slight honour for a young man of twenty to win the chancellor's gold medal". He published his first solo collection of poems, Poems Chiefly Lyrical in 1830. "Claribel" and "Mariana", which later took their place among Tennyson's most celebrated poems, were included in this volume. Although decried by some critics as overly sentimental, his verse soon proved popular and brought Tennyson to the attention of well-known writers of the day, including Samuel Taylor Coleridge.

=== Return to Lincolnshire, second publication, Epping Forest ===
In the spring of 1831, Tennyson's father died, requiring him to leave Cambridge before taking his degree. He returned to the rectory, where he was permitted to live for another six years and shared responsibility for his widowed mother and the family. Arthur Hallam came to stay with his family during the summer and became engaged to Tennyson's sister, Emilia Tennyson.

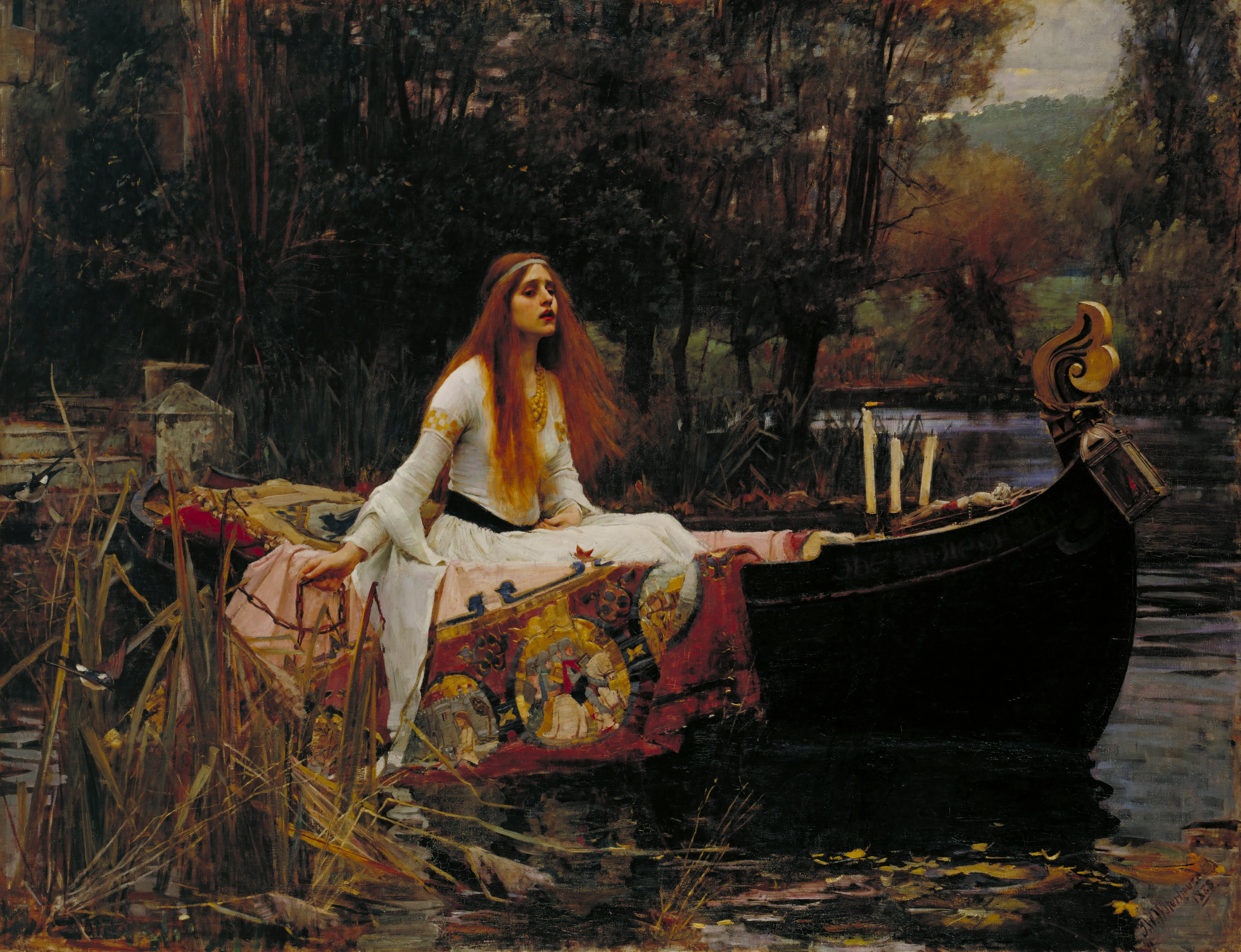
John William Waterhouse's The Lady of Shalott, 1888 (Tate Britain, London)

The May Queen

YOU must wake and call me early, call me early,
mother dear;
To-morrow 'll be the happiest time of all the glad
new-year, –
Of all the glad new-year, mother, the maddest,
merriest day;
For I'm to be Queen o' the May, mother, I'm to
be Queen o' the May.

As I came up the valley, whom think ye should
I see
But Robin leaning on the bridge beneath the
hazel-tree?
He thought of that sharp look, mother, I gave
him yesterday, –
But I'm to be Queen o' the May, mother, I'm to
be Queen o' the May.

They say he's dying all for love, – but that can
never be;
They say his heart is breaking, mother, – what
is that to me?
There's many a bolder lad 'll woo me any sum-
mer day;
And I'm to be Queen o' the May, mother, I'm to
be Queen o' the May.

If I can, I'll come again, mother, from out my
resting-place;
Though you'll not see me, mother, I shall look
upon your face;
Though I cannot speak a word, I shall hearken
what you say,
And be often, often with you when you think I'm
far away.

So now I think my time is near; I trust it is.
I know
The blessed music went that way my soul will
have to go.
And for myself, indeed, I care not if I go to-day;
But Effie, you must comfort her when I am past
away.

And say to Robin a kind word, and tell him not
to fret;
There's many worthier than I, would make him
happy yet.
If I had lived – I cannot tell – I might have
been his wife;
But all these things have ceased to be, with my
desire of life.

Forever and forever, all in a blessed home,
And there to wait a little while till you and
Effie come, –
To lie within the light of God, as I lie upon your
breast, –
And the wicked cease from troubling, and the
weary are at rest.

— From "The May Queen" poem by Alfred Tennyson

In 1833, Tennyson published his second book of poetry, which notably included the first version of "The Lady of Shalott". The volume met heavy criticism, which so discouraged Tennyson that he did not publish again for ten years, although he did continue to write. That same year, Hallam died suddenly and unexpectedly after suffering a cerebral haemorrhage while on a holiday in Vienna. Hallam's death had a profound effect on Tennyson and inspired several poems, including "In the Valley of Cauteretz" and "In Memoriam A.H.H.", a long poem detailing the "Way of the Soul".

Tennyson and his family were allowed to stay in the rectory for some time, but later moved to Beech Hill Park, High Beach, deep within Epping Forest, Essex, about 1837. Tennyson's son recalled: "there was a pond in the park on which in winter my father might be seen skating, sailing about on the ice in his long blue cloak. He liked the nearness of London, whither he resorted to see his friends, but he could not stay in town even for a night, his mother being in such a nervous state that he did not like to leave her". Tennyson befriended a Dr Allen, who ran a nearby asylum whose patients then included the poet John Clare. An unwise investment in Dr Allen's ecclesiastical wood-carving enterprise soon led to the loss of much of the family fortune, and led to a bout of serious depression. According to Tennyson's grandson Sir Charles Tennyson, Tennyson met Thomas Carlyle in 1839, if not earlier. The pair began a lifelong friendship, and were famous smoking companions. Some of Tennyson's work even bears the influence of Carlyle and his ideas. Tennyson moved to London in 1840 and lived for a time at Chapel House, Twickenham.

=== Third publication ===
On 14 May 1842, while living modestly in London, Tennyson published the two-volume Poems, of which the first included works already published and the second was made up almost entirely of new poems. They met with immediate success; poems from this collection, such as "Locksley Hall", "Break, Break, Break", and "Ulysses", and a new version of "The Lady of Shalott", have met enduring fame. "The Princess: A Medley", a satire on women's education that came out in 1847, was also popular for its lyrics. W. S. Gilbert later adapted and parodied the piece twice: in The Princess (1870) and in Princess Ida (1884).

It was in 1850 that Tennyson reached the pinnacle of his career, finally publishing his masterpiece, In Memoriam A.H.H., dedicated to Hallam. Later the same year, he was appointed Poet Laureate of the United Kingdom, succeeding William Wordsworth. In the same year (on 13 June), Tennyson married Emily Sellwood, whom he had known since childhood, in the village of Shiplake. They had two sons, Hallam Tennyson (b. 11 August 1852)—named after his friend—and Lionel (b. 16 March 1854).

Tennyson rented Farringford House on the Isle of Wight in 1853, eventually buying it in 1856. He eventually found that there were too many starstruck tourists who pestered him in Farringford, so he moved to Aldworth, in West Sussex in 1869. However, he retained Farringford and regularly returned there to spend the winters.

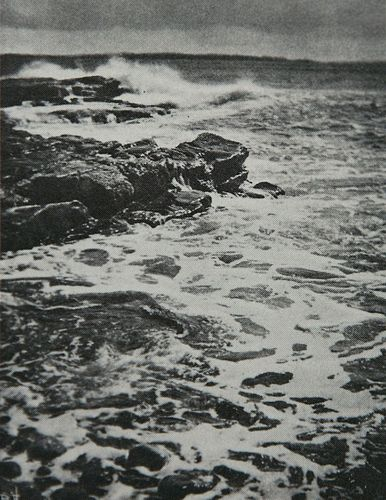
Break, Break, Break, on thy cold grey Stones, o Sea, a photograph by Rudolf Eickemeyer Jr. The title is a quote from the 1842 poem.

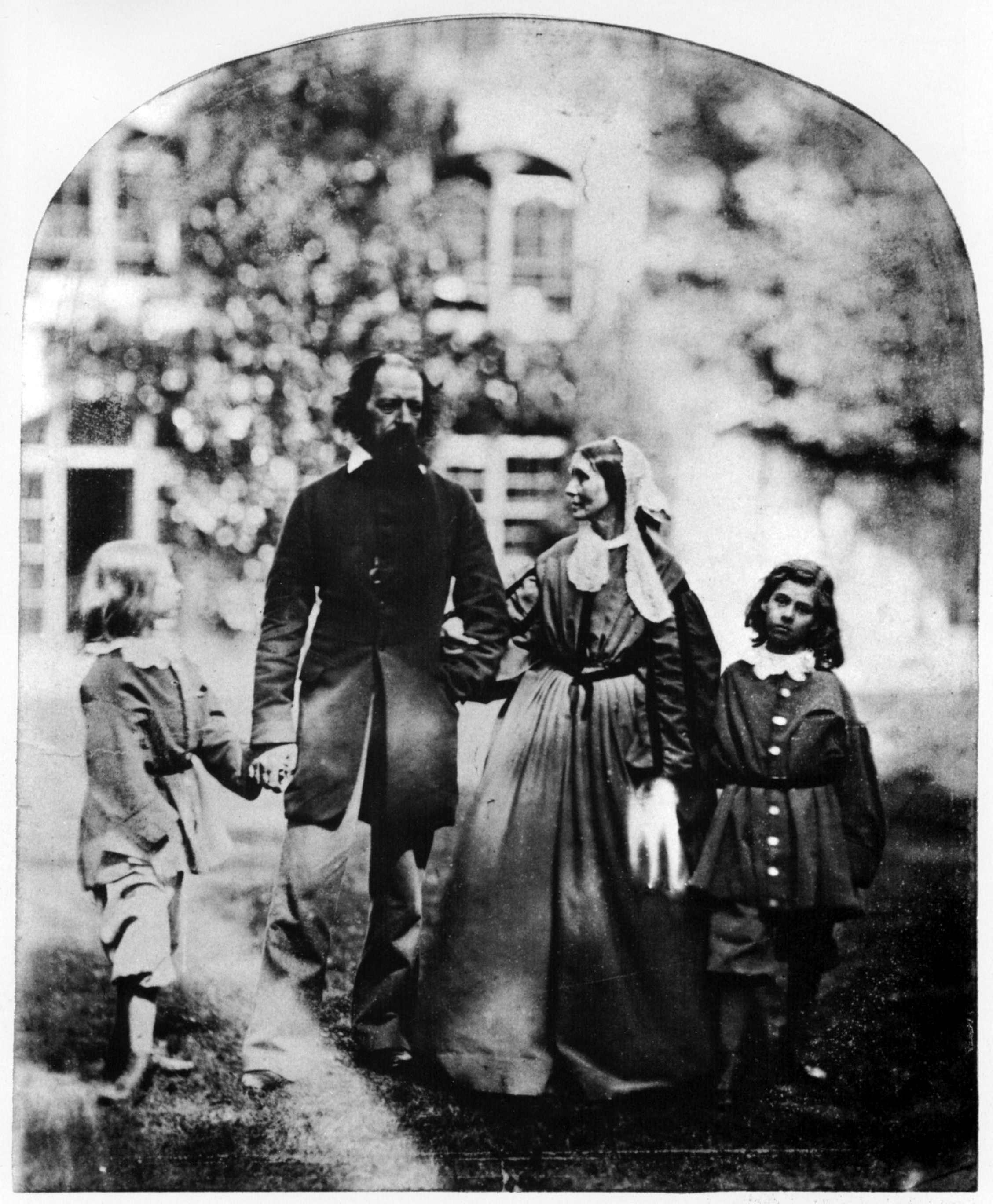
Tennyson in 1862, with his wife Emily (1813–1896) and his sons Hallam (1852–1928) and Lionel (1854–1886)

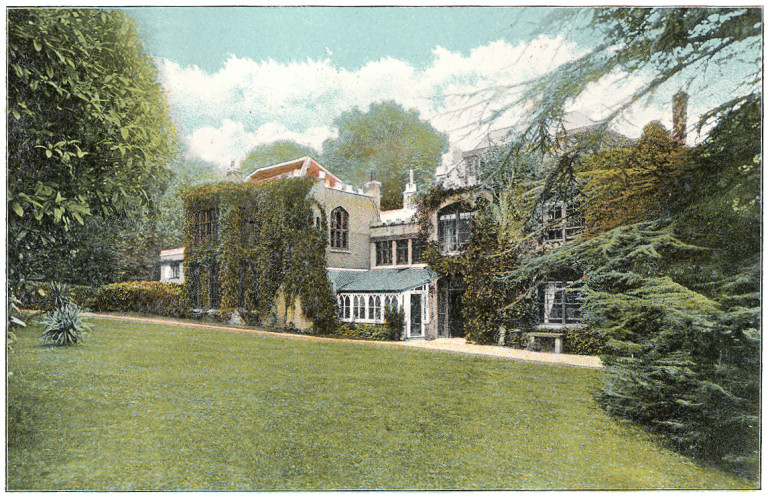
Farringford, Tennyson's residence on the Isle of Wight

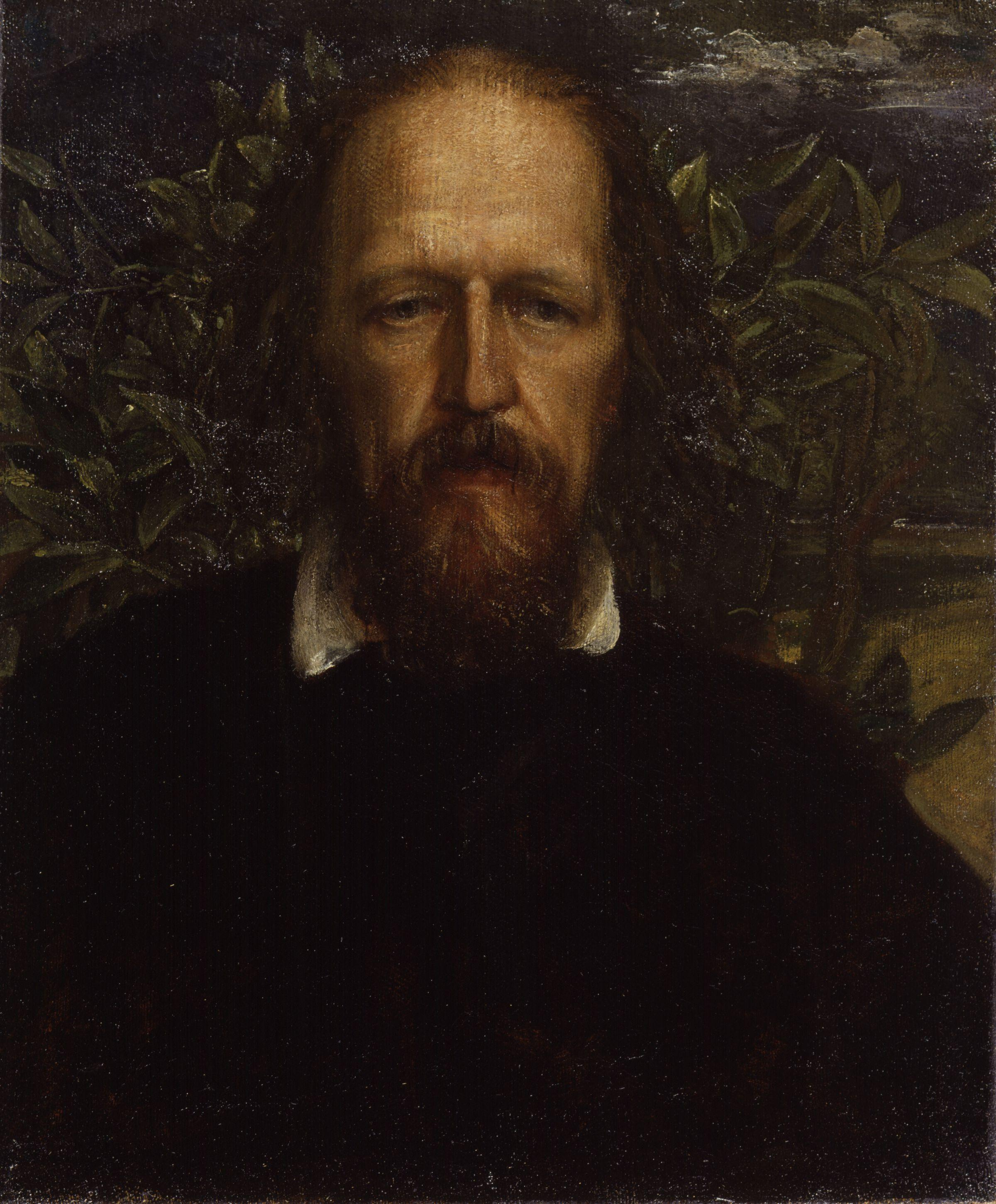
Alfred Tennyson, 1st Baron Tennyson, by George Frederic Watts (1817–1904)

=== Poet Laureate ===
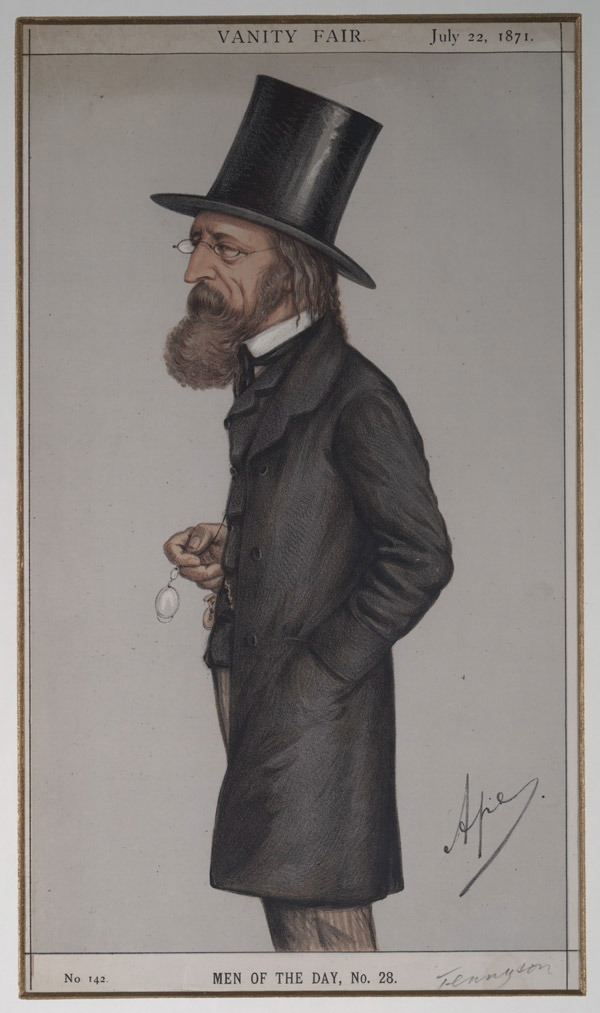
Captioned "The Poet Laureate", caricature of Tennyson in Vanity Fair, 22 July 1871

In 1850, after Wordsworth's death and Samuel Rogers' refusal, Tennyson was appointed Poet Laureate; Elizabeth Barrett Browning and Leigh Hunt had also been considered. He held the position until his death in 1892, the longest tenure of any laureate. Tennyson fulfilled the requirements of this position, such as by authoring a poem of greeting to Princess Alexandra of Denmark when she arrived in Britain to marry the future King Edward VII. In 1855, Tennyson produced one of his best-known works, "The Charge of the Light Brigade", a dramatic tribute to the British cavalrymen involved in an ill-advised charge on 25 October 1854, during the Crimean War. Other works written in the post of Poet Laureate include "Ode on the Death of the Duke of Wellington" and "Ode Sung at the Opening of the International Exhibition".

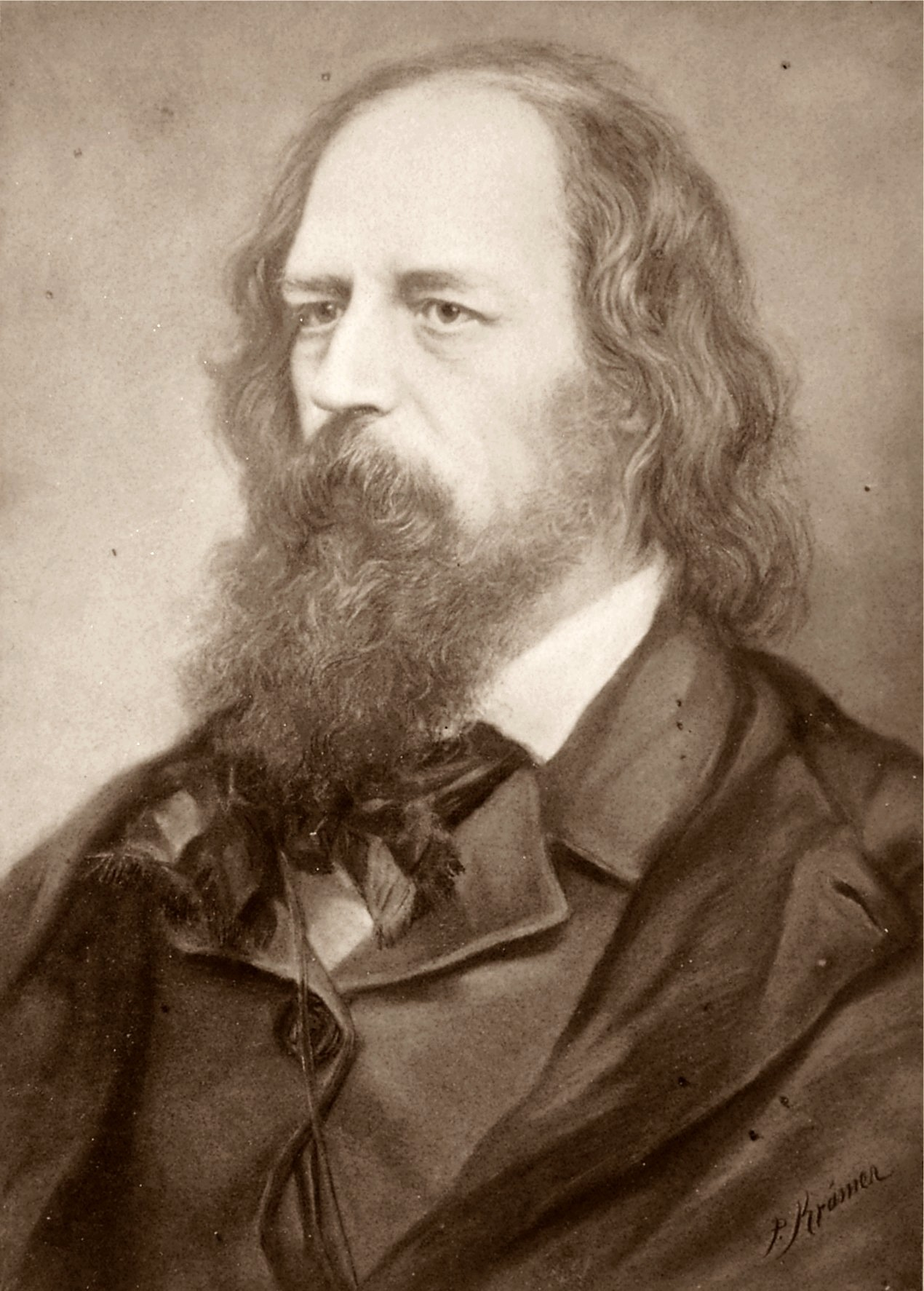
Alfred Tennyson, portrait by P. Krämer

Tennyson declined a baronetcy offered him by Benjamin Disraeli in 1865 and 1868, finally accepting a peerage in 1883 at William Ewart Gladstone's earnest solicitation. In 1884 Queen Victoria created him Baron Tennyson, of Aldworth in the County of Sussex and of Freshwater in the Isle of Wight. He took his seat in the House of Lords on 11 March 1884.

Tennyson also wrote a substantial quantity of unofficial political verse, from the bellicose "Form, Riflemen, Form", on the French crisis of 1859 and the Creation of the Volunteer Force, to "Steersman, be not precipitate in thine act/of steering", deploring Gladstone's Home Rule Bill. Tennyson's family were Whigs by tradition and Tennyson's own politics fitted the Whig mould, although he would also vote for the Liberal Party after the Whigs dissolved. Tennyson believed that society should progress through gradual and steady reform, not revolution, and this attitude was reflected in his attitude toward universal suffrage, which he did not outright reject, but recommended only after the masses had been properly educated and adjusted to self-government. Upon passage of the Reform Act 1832, Tennyson broke into a local church to ring the bells in celebration.

Virginia Woolf wrote a play called Freshwater, showing Tennyson as host to his friends Julia Margaret Cameron and G. F. Watts. Colonel George Edward Gouraud, Thomas Edison's European agent, made sound recordings of Tennyson reading his own poetry, late in his life. They include recordings of "The Charge of the Light Brigade", and excerpts from "The splendour falls" (from The Princess), "Come into the garden" (from Maud), "Ask me no more", "Ode on the death of the Duke of Wellington" and "Lancelot and Elaine". The sound quality is poor, as wax cylinder recordings usually are.

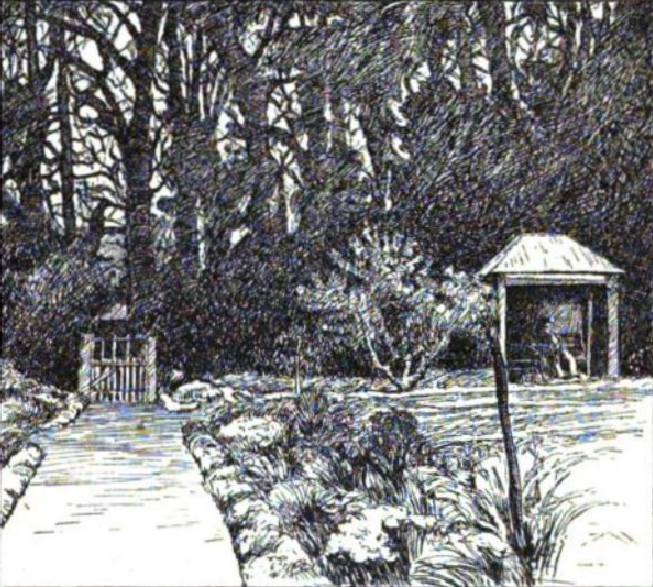
Published one year after Tennyson's death, this sketch depicts him sitting in his favourite arbour at Farringford House, his home in the village of Freshwater, Isle of Wight.

Towards the end of his life Tennyson revealed that his "religious beliefs also defied convention, leaning towards agnosticism and pandeism": In a characteristically Victorian manner, Tennyson combines a deep interest in contemporary science with an unorthodox, even idiosyncratic, Christian belief. He wrote in In Memoriam: "There lives more faith in honest doubt, believe me, than in half the creeds." In Maud, 1855, he wrote: "The churches have killed their Christ". In "Locksley Hall Sixty Years After", Tennyson wrote: "Christian love among the churches look'd the twin of heathen hate." In his play Becket, he wrote: "We are self-uncertain creatures, and we may, Yea, even when we know not, mix our spites and private hates with our defence of Heaven". Tennyson recorded in his Diary (p. 127): "I believe in Pantheism of a sort". His son's biography confirms that Tennyson was an unorthodox Christian, noting that Tennyson praised Giordano Bruno and Baruch Spinoza on his deathbed, saying of Bruno, "His view of God is in some ways mine", in 1892.

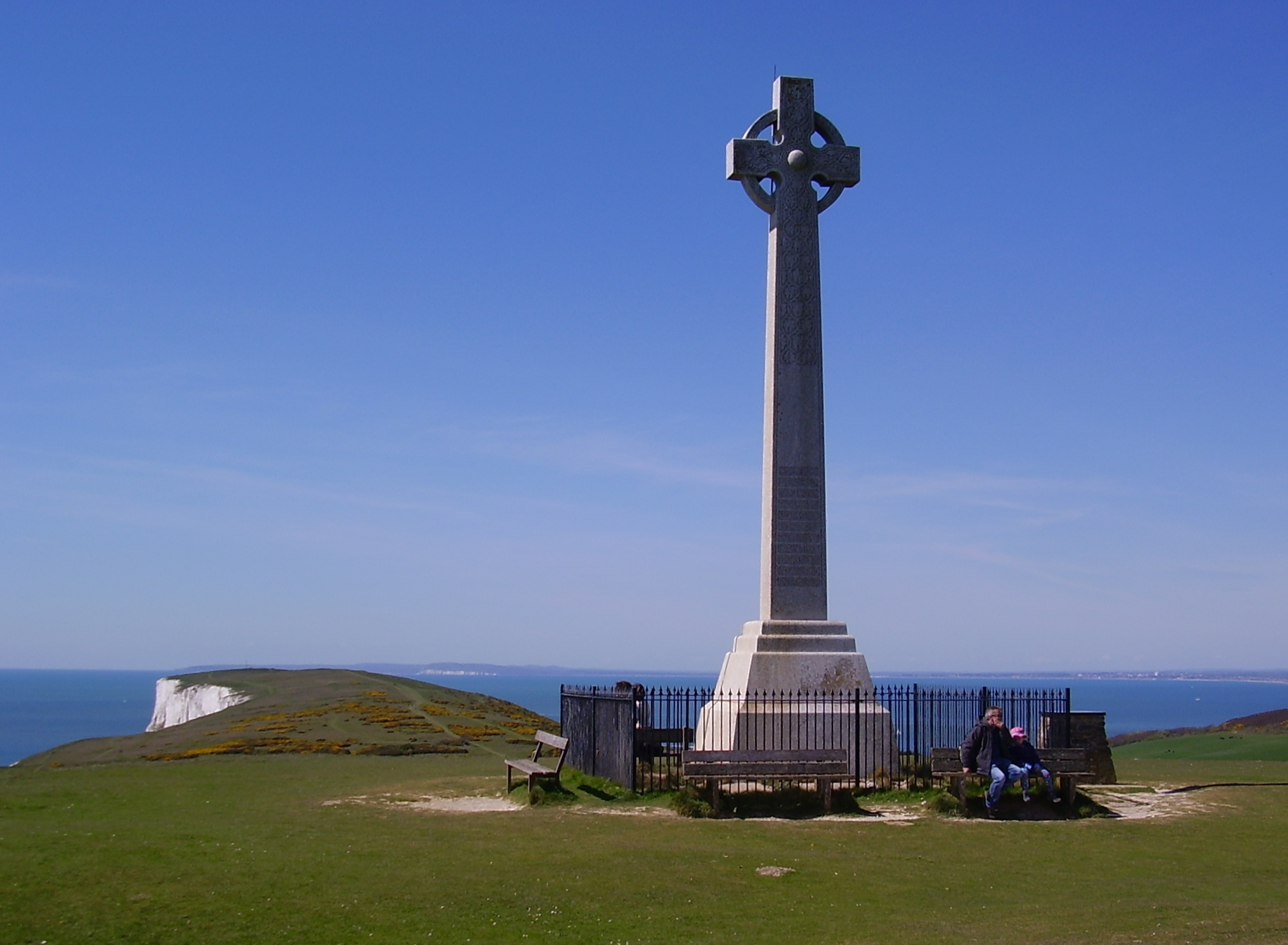
Monument to Tennyson on Tennyson Down, Isle of Wight

Tennyson continued writing into his eighties. He died on 6 October 1892 at Aldworth, aged 83. He was buried at Westminster Abbey. A memorial was erected in All Saints' Church, Freshwater. His last words were, "Oh that press will have me now!". He left an estate of £57,206. Tennyson Down and the Tennyson Trail on the Isle of Wight are named after him, and a monument to him stands on top of Tennyson Down. Lake Tennyson in New Zealand's high country, named by Frederick Weld, is assumed to be named after Tennyson.

He was succeeded as 2nd Baron Tennyson by his son Hallam, who produced an authorised biography of his father in 1897, and was later the second Governor-General of Australia.

== Tennyson and the Queen ==
Although Prince Albert, was largely responsible for Tennyson's appointment as Laureate, Queen Victoria became an ardent admirer of Tennyson's work, writing in her diary that she was "much soothed & pleased" by reading In Memoriam A.H.H. after Albert's death.

The two met twice, first in April 1862, when Victoria wrote in her diary, "very peculiar looking, tall, dark, with a fine head, long black flowing hair & a beard, oddly dressed, but there is no affectation about him."

Tennyson met her a second time just over two decades later, on 7 August 1883, and the Queen told him what a comfort In Memoriam A.H.H. had been.

== The art of Tennyson's poetry ==
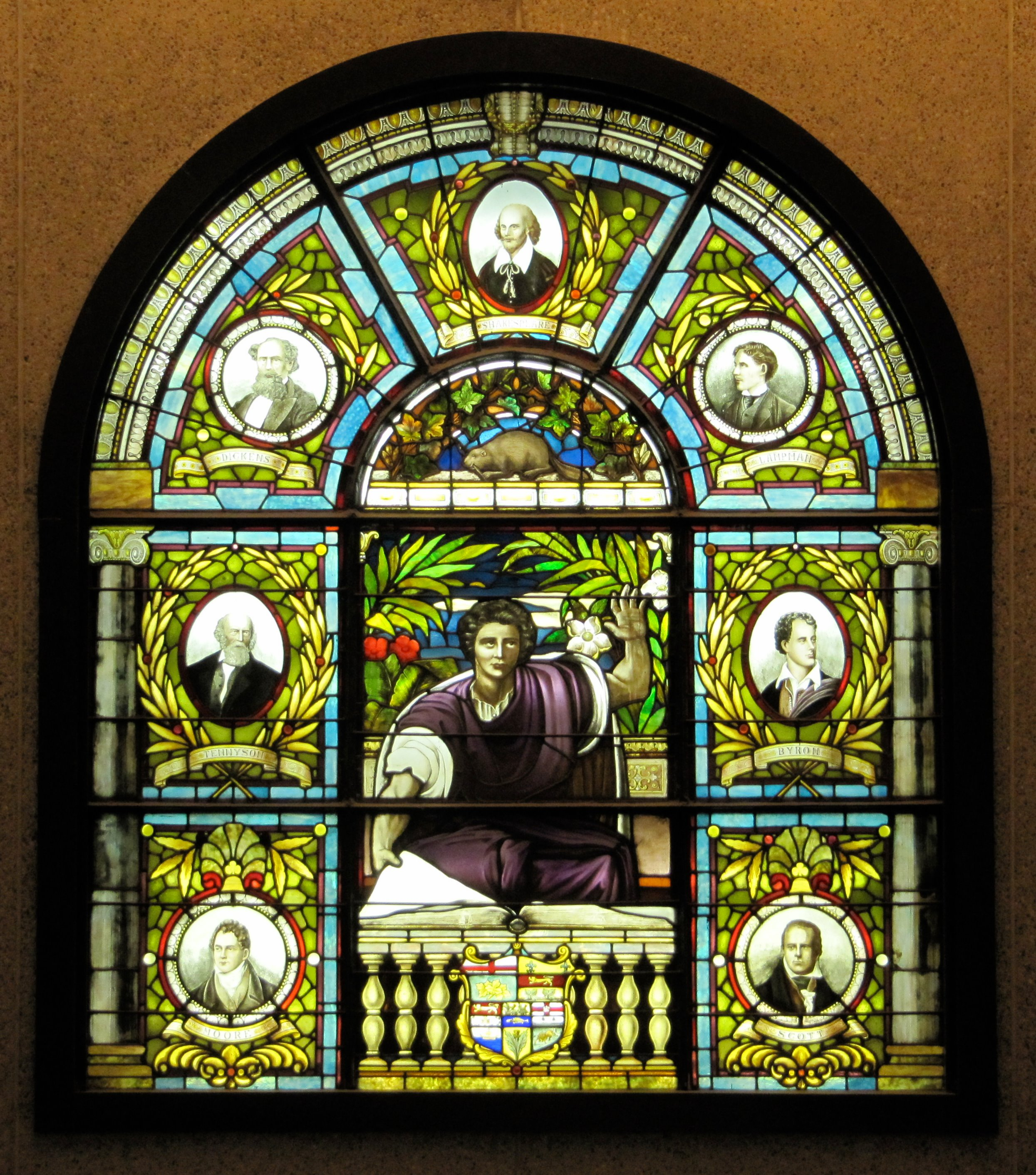
Stained glass at Ottawa Public Library featuring Charles Dickens, Archibald Lampman, Walter Scott, Lord Byron, Tennyson, William Shakespeare, and Thomas Moore

As source material for his poetry, Tennyson used a wide range of subject matter, from medieval legends to classical myths and from domestic situations to observations of nature. The influence of John Keats and other Romantic poets published before and during his childhood is evident from the richness of his imagery and descriptive writing. He also handled rhythm masterfully. The insistent beat of "Break, Break, Break" emphasises the relentless sadness of the subject matter. Tennyson's use of the musical qualities of words to emphasise his rhythms and meanings is sensitive. The language of "I come from haunts of coot and hern" lilts and ripples like the brook in the poem and the last two lines of "Come down O maid from yonder mountain height" illustrate his telling combination of onomatopoeia, alliteration, and assonance:

The moan of doves in immemorial elms
And murmuring of innumerable bees.

Tennyson was a craftsman who polished and revised his manuscripts extensively, to the point where his efforts at self-editing were described by his contemporary Robert Browning as "insane", symptomatic of "mental infirmity". His complex compositional practice and frequent redrafting also demonstrates a dynamic relationship between images and words, as can be seen in the many notebooks he worked in. Few poets have used such a variety of styles with such an exact understanding of metre; like many Victorian poets, he experimented in adapting the quantitative metres of Greek and Latin poetry to English. He reflects the Victorian period of his maturity in his feeling for order and his tendency towards moralising. He also reflects a concern common among Victorian writers in being troubled by the conflict between religious faith and expanding scientific knowledge. Tennyson possessed a strong poetic power, which his early readers often attributed to his "Englishness" and his masculinity. Well known among his longer works are Maud and Idylls of the King, the latter arguably the most famous Victorian adaptation of the legend of King Arthur and the Knights of the Round Table. A common thread of grief, melancholy, and loss connects much of his poetry (including "Mariana", "The Lotos Eaters", "Tears, Idle Tears", "In Memoriam"), possibly reflecting Tennyson's lifelong struggle with debilitating depression. T. S. Eliot described Tennyson as "the saddest of all English poets", whose technical mastery of verse and language provided a "surface" to his poetry's "depths, to the abyss of sorrow". Other poets such as W. H. Auden maintained a more critical stance, stating that Tennyson was the "stupidest" of all the English poets, adding that: "There was little about melancholia he didn't know; there was little else that he did."

== Influence on Pre-Raphaelite artists ==
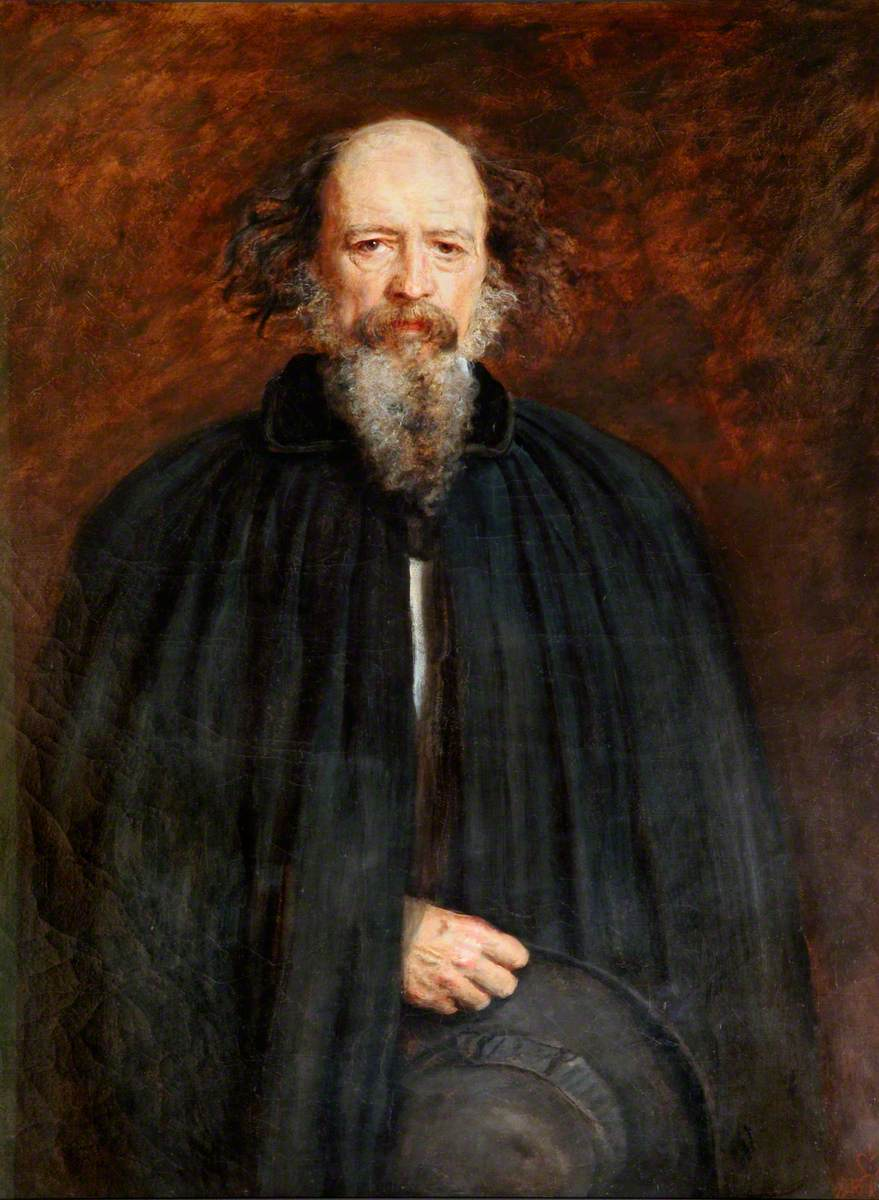
Portrait of Alfred Tennyson by John Everett Millais, 1881

Tennyson's early poetry, with its medievalism and powerful visual imagery, was a major influence on the Pre-Raphaelite Brotherhood. In 1848 Dante Gabriel Rossetti and William Holman Hunt made a list of "Immortals", artistic heroes whom they admired, especially from literature, notably including John Keats and Tennyson, whose work would form subjects for PRB paintings. The Lady of Shalott alone was a subject for Rossetti, Hunt, John William Waterhouse (three versions), and Elizabeth Siddal.

== Tennyson heraldry ==
A heraldic achievement of Tennyson exists in an 1884 stained-glass window in the Hall of Trinity College, Cambridge, showing arms:

Gules, a bend nebuly or thereon a chaplet vert between three leopard's faces jessant-de-lys of the second; Crest: A dexter arm in armour the hand in a gauntlet or grasping a broken tilting spear enfiled with a garland of laurel; Supporters: Two leopards rampant guardant gules semée de lys and ducally crowned or; Motto: Respiciens Prospiciens ("Looking backwards (is) looking forwards").

These are a difference of the arms of Thomas Tenison (1636–1715), Archbishop of Canterbury, themselves a difference of the arms of the 13th-century Denys family of Glamorgan and Siston in Gloucestershire, themselves a difference of the arms of Thomas de Cantilupe (c. 1218–1282), Bishop of Hereford, henceforth the arms of the See of Hereford; the name "Tennyson" signifies "Denys's son", although no connection between the two families is recorded.

== Works ==
A list of works by Tennyson follows:

- Poems by Two Brothers (published 1826; dated 1827 on title page; written with Charles Tennyson)
- "Timbuctoo" (for which he won the chancellor's gold medal and was printed in Prolusiones Academicæ)
- Poems, Chiefly Lyrical (1830), in which fifty-six poems were published
- "No More", '"Anacreontics" and "A Fragment" contributed to The Gem: A Literary Annual (1831)
- "Sonnet" (Check every outflash, every ruder sally) in The Englishman's Magazine (August 1831) and later reprinted in Friendship's Offering (1833)
- Poems (published 1832, but dated 1833 on title page), in which the following poems were published:
  - "A Dream of Fair Women"
  - "The Lady of Shalott" – the poem's subject was depicted in three paintings (1888, 1894, and 1916) by John William Waterhouse
  - "The Lotos-Eaters"
  - "Oenone"
  - "The Palace of Art"
  - "St. Simeon Stylites" (1833)
- The Lover's Tale (Two parts published in 1833; Tennyson suppressed it immediately after publication as he felt it was imperfect. A revised version comprising three parts was subsequently published in 1879 together with "The Golden Supper" as a fourth part.)
- "Rosalinde" (1833; suppressed until 1884)
- Poems (1842; with numerous subsequent editions including the 4th edition (1846) and 8th edition (1853)); the collection included many of the poems published in the 1833 anthology (some in revised form), and the following:
  - "'Break, Break, Break'"
  - "The Day-Dream"
  - "A Dream of Fair Women"
  - "Godiva"
  - "Lady Clara Vere de Vere" (1832)
  - "Locksley Hall"
  - "Sir Galahad" (written September 1834)
  - "The Two Voices" (written 1833–1834)
  - "Ulysses" (1833)
  - "The Vision of Sin"
- The Princess: A Medley (1847), which includes the following poems:
  - "Now Sleeps the Crimson Petal" – later appeared as a song in the film Vanity Fair (2004), with musical arrangement by Mychael Danna
  - "Tears, Idle Tears"
- In Memoriam (1850), which includes the following poem:
  - "Ring Out, Wild Bells" (1850)
- "The Eagle" (1851)
- "The Sister's Shame"
- Maud, and Other Poems (1855), in which the following poems were published:
  - "Maud"
  - "The Brook; an Idyl"
  - "The Charge of the Light Brigade" (1854) – an early recording exists of Tennyson reading this
- Idylls of the King (1859–1885; composed 1833–1874)
- Enoch Arden and Other Poems (1862/1864), in which the following poems were published:
  - "Enoch Arden"
  - "Tithonus"
  - Ode for the Opening of the Exhibition (1862) with music composed by William Sterndale Bennett
- The Holy Grail and Other Poems (1870), in which the following poem was published:
  - "Flower in the Crannied Wall" (1869)
- The Window; or, The Songs of the Wrens (written 1867–1870; published 1871) – a song cycle with music composed by Arthur Sullivan
- Queen Mary: A Drama (1875) – a play about Mary I of England
- Harold: A Drama (1877) – a play about Harold II of England
- Montenegro (1877)
- The Revenge: A Ballad of the Fleet (1878) – about the ship Revenge
- Ballads and Other Poems (1880)
- Becket (1884)
- Crossing the Bar (1889)
- The Foresters (1891) – a play about Robin Hood with incidental music by Arthur Sullivan
- Kapiolani (published after his death by Hallam Tennyson)

== Musical settings ==
Michael William Balfe's setting of "Come Into the Garden, Maud" was a popular success in 1857, as sung by the celebrated tenor Sims Reeves. Arthur Somervell's Maud (1898) used thirteen poems (not all of them complete) for his song cycle, enough "to retain a cogent narrative". Stephen Banfield believes it is "the nearest an English composer ever came to writing a substantial, Romantic song-cycle".

Charles Villiers Stanford set "Crossing the Bar" for high voice and piano in April 1880, a year after the poem has been first published. Maude Valérie White (four songs, 1885) and Liza Lehmann (10 songs, 1899) both composed song cycles selecting passages from In Memoriam. Roger Quilter set "Now sleeps the crimson petal" (from The Princess) for voice and orchestra in 1905. Ada Weigel Powers (1863–1947) used Tennyson's text for her song “Elaine.” Anna Ware Poole used Tennyson's text for her song “What Does the Little Birdie Say.” "The splendour falls on castle walls" (also from The Princess), has been set by many composers, including Arnold Bax, Benjamin Britten, Cecil Armstrong Gibbs, Gustav Holst, Stanford, Vaughan Williams and Charles Wood. Karl Jenkins used several stanzas from Ring Out, Wild Bells in the last movement of his 1999 work The Armed Man: A Mass For Peace.

Tennyson deplored the use of unauthorised repetition in song settings, a device used by many composers, and so tried to circumvent this by supplying his own, as in "Break, Break, Break" (set by Sidney Lanier in 1871 and Cyril Rootham in 1906), and the repetition of "dying" in "The splendour falls", which as Trevor Hold points out, "has been a god-send to every composer who has set it".

== Popular culture ==
Tennyson's "Ulysses" was quoted in the 2012 James Bond film Skyfall, with the character M (played by actress Judi Dench) reciting the poem. The film's soundtrack also included an accompanying track, composed by Thomas Newman, that is titled "Tennyson".

== Arms ==
Coat of arms of Alfred, Lord Tennyson
Coronet A Coronet of a baron Crest A dexter arm in armour the hand in a gauntlet Or grasping a broken tilting spear enfiled with a garland of laurel Escutcheon Gules, a bend nebuly or thereon a chaplet in the chief point Vert between three leopard's faces jessant-de-lys of the second Supporters On either side a leopard rampant guardant Gules semy-de-lys and ducally crowned Or Motto Respiciens Prospiciens (Latin: "Looking backwards (is) looking forwards" (i.e. "History repeats itself"; "If you want to see into the future study the past")

== General bibliography ==
- Alfred, Lord Tennyson (1989). Tennyson: A Selected Edition. Berkeley and Los Angeles, California: University of California Press. ISBN 0520065883 (hbk.) or ISBN 0520066669 (pbk.). Edited with a preface and notes by Christopher Ricks. Selections from the definitive edition The Poems of Tennyson, with readings from the Trinity MSS; long works such as Maud and In Memoriam A. H. H. are printed in full.
- Gosse, Edmund William (1911). "Tennyson, Alfred Tennyson, 1st Baron" . In Chisholm, Hugh (ed.). Encyclopædia Britannica. Vol. 26 (11th ed.). Cambridge University Press. pp. 630–634.
- William Allingham; The Diaries, introduction by John Julius Norwich. London: The Folio Society, 1990.
- John Batchelor, Tennyson: To Strive, to Seek, to Find. London: Chatto & Windus, 2012. ISBN 978-0-701-18058-4
- Philip Henderson, Tennyson: Poet and Prophet. London: Routledge & Kegan Paul, 1978. ISBN 978-0-710-08776-8
- Peter Levi, Tennyson. London: Macmillan, 1993. ISBN 978-0-333-52205-9
- F. L. Lucas, Tennyson, Writers and Their Work series, no. 83, London: Longmans, Green & Co., 1957.
- Robert Bernard Martin, Tennyson the Unquiet Heart. Oxford University Press, 1980. ISBN 978-0-198-12072-8
- Harold Nicolson, Tennyson: Aspects of His Life, Character and Poetry. London: Constable & Co., 1923.
- Joanna Richardson, The Pre-Eminent Victorian: A Study of Tennyson. London: Jonathan Cape, 1962.
- Michael Thorn, Tennyson: The Man and His Work. London: Little, Brown, 1992. ISBN 978-0-316-90299-1
- Ann Thwaite, Emily Tennyson: The Poet's Wife. London: Faber & Faber, 1996. ISBN 978-0-571-16554-4
- Lynne Truss, Tennyson and His Circle. London: National Portrait Gallery, 1999. ISBN 978-1-855-14257-2
- Andrew Wheatcroft, The Tennyson Album: A Biography in Original Photographs, with an introduction by Sir John Betjeman. London: Routledge & Kegan Paul, 1980. ISBN 978-0-710-00494-9

Court offices
Preceded by William Wordsworth	British Poet Laureate; 1850–1892	Succeeded by Alfred Austin
Peerage of the United Kingdom
New title	Baron Tennyson; 1884–1892	Succeeded by Hallam Tennyson
