= Arthur Hallam =

English poet (1811–1833)

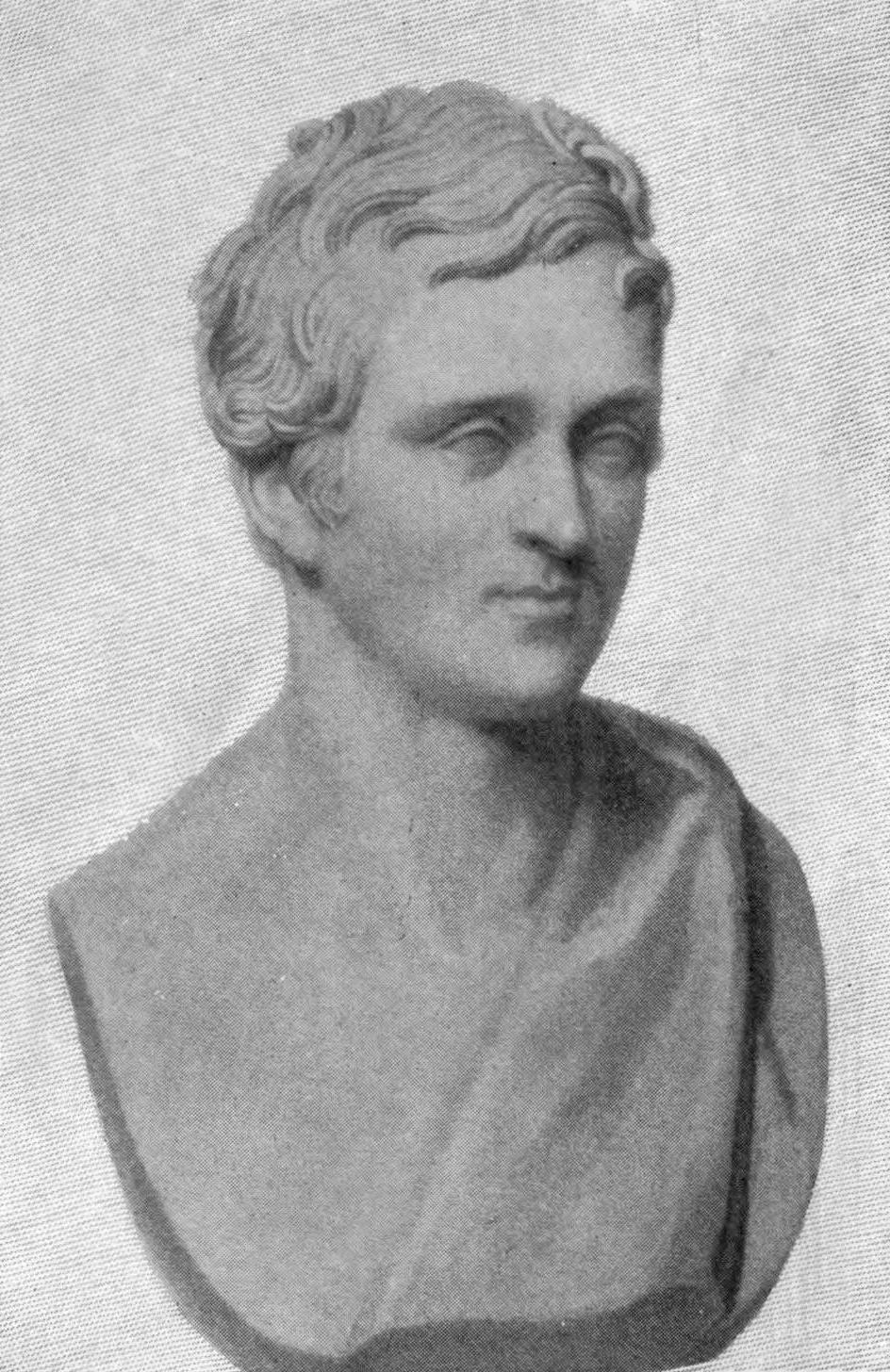
Bust of Hallam by Francis Leggatt Chantrey

Arthur Henry Hallam (1 February 1811 – 15 September 1833) was an English poet, best known as the subject of a major work, In Memoriam, by his close friend and fellow poet Alfred Tennyson. Hallam has been described as the jeune homme fatal (French for "deadly [seductive] young man") of his generation.

== Early life and education ==
Hallam was born in London, the son of the historian Henry Hallam. He attended school at Eton, where he met the future prime minister William Ewart Gladstone. Hallam was an important influence on Gladstone, introducing him to Whiggish ideas and people. Other friends included James Milnes Gaskell.

After leaving Eton in 1827 Hallam travelled on the continent with his family, and in Italy, he became inspired by its culture and fell in love with an English beauty, Anna Mildred Wintour, who inspired eleven of his poems.

In October 1828, Hallam went up to Trinity College, Cambridge, where he met and befriended Tennyson. As Christopher Ricks observes, "The friendship of Hallam and Tennyson was swift and deep".

== Friendship with Tennyson ==
Hallam and Tennyson became friends in April 1829. They both entered the Chancellor's Prize Poem Competition (which Tennyson won). Both joined the Cambridge Apostles (a private debating society), which met every Saturday night during term to discuss, over coffee and sardines on toast ("whales"), serious questions of religion, literature and society. (Hallam read a paper on "whether the poems of Shelley have an immoral tendency"; Tennyson was to speak on "Ghosts", but was, according to his son's Memoir, "too shy to deliver it" – only the Preface to the essay survives). Meetings of the Apostles were not always so intimidating: Desmond MacCarthy gave an account of Hallam and Tennyson at one meeting lying on the ground in order to laugh less painfully, when James Spedding imitated the sun going behind a cloud and coming out again.

During the Christmas holidays, Hallam visited Tennyson's home in Somersby, Lincolnshire; on 20 December he met and fell in love with Tennyson's eighteen-year-old sister, Emilia, who was seven months younger than Hallam.

Hallam spent the 1830 Easter holidays with Tennyson in Somersby and declared his love for Emilia. Hallam and Tennyson planned to publish a book of poems together: Hallam told Mrs Tennyson that he saw this "as a sort of seal of our friendship". Hallam's father, however, objected, and Hallam's Poems was privately published and printed in 1830. In the summer holidays, Tennyson and Hallam travelled to the Pyrenees (on a secret mission to take money and instructions written in invisible ink to General Torrijos who was planning a revolution against the tyranny of King Ferdinand VII of Spain). In December, Hallam again visited Somersby and became engaged to Emilia. His father forbade him to visit Somersby until he came of age at twenty-one.

In February 1831, Tennyson's father died, with the result that Tennyson could no longer afford to continue at Cambridge. In August, Hallam wrote an enthusiastic article "On Some of the Characteristics of Modern Poetry, and on the Lyrical Poems of Alfred Tennyson" for the Englishman's Magazine. He introduced Tennyson to the publisher Edward Moxon.

In February 1832, Hallam visited Emilia: "I love her madly", he wrote. She was charmed by his "bright, angelic spirit and his gentle, chivalrous manner". In July Tennyson and Hallam travelled to the Rhine. In October Hallam entered the office of a conveyancer, Mr Walters, of Lincoln's Inn Fields. In December, thanks largely to Hallam's support and practical help, Tennyson's second volume of poetry was published. Hallam again spent Christmas at Somersby.

== Death ==
In July 1833, Hallam visited Emilia. On 3 August, he left with his father for Europe. On 13 September, they went to Vienna, with Hallam complaining of fever and chill. It was apparently a recurrence of the "ague" he had suffered earlier that year, and, although it would delay their departure to Prague, there seemed to be little cause for alarm. Quinine and a few days rest were prescribed. By Sunday 15th, Hallam felt sufficiently better to take a short walk with his father in the evening. When he returned to the hotel he ordered some sack and lay down on the sofa, talking cheerfully all the time. Leaving his son reading in front of the fire, his father went out for a further stroll. He returned to find Hallam still on the sofa, apparently asleep apart from the position of his head. All efforts to rouse him were in vain. Arthur Hallam was dead at the age of twenty-two.

The medical report on the death certificate listed Schlagfluss (a stroke) as the cause of death; a blood vessel near the brain had suddenly burst. The autopsy declared "a weakness of the cerebral vessels, and a want of sufficient energy in the heart". The coffin was quickly sealed and sent to the nearest seaport, to be returned to England for burial.

In the first week of October, Tennyson received a letter from Arthur Hallam's uncle, Henry Elton:

Addressed to Alfred Tennyson Esqre: if Absent, to be opened by Mrs Tennyson
Somersby Rectory
Spilsby
Lincolnshire

Clifton. 1 October. 1833

My Dear Sir —

At the desire of a most afflicted family, I write to you because they are unequal, from the Abyss of grief into which they have fallen, to do it themselves.
Your friend, Sir, and my much-loved Nephew, Arthur Hallam, is no more – it has pleased God to remove him from this his first scene of Existence, to that better world for which he was Created.
He died at Vienna, on his return from Buda, by Apoplexy, and I believe his Remains come by Sea from Trieste.
Mr Hallam arrived this morning in 3 Princes Buildings.
May that Being in whose hands are all the Destinies of Man – and who has promised to comfort all that Mourn – pour the Balm of Consolation on all the Families who are bowed down by this unexpected dispensation!
I have just seen Mr Hallam, who begs I will tell you that he will write himself as soon as his Heart will let him. Poor Arthur had a slight attack of Ague – which he had often had – Order'd his fire to be lighted – and talked with as much cheerfulness as usual – He suddenly became insensible, and his Spirit departed without Pain – The Physician endeavour'd to get any Blood from him – and on Examination it was the General Opinion that he could not have lived long – This was also Dr Holland's opinion – The account I have endeavour'd to give you, is merely what I have been able to gather, but the family of course are in too great distress to enter into details —

I am, dear Sir —
your very Obt. Servt.

Henry Elton.

Tennyson broke the news to Emilia and caught her as she fainted. Gladstone received the news on 6 October: "When shall I see his like?" he wrote. "I walked upon the hills to muse upon this very mournful event, which cuts me to the heart. Alas for his family and his intended bride!"

To his friends, Hallam's death came as "a loud and terrible stroke from the reality of things upon the faery building of our youth". They remembered him in vivid elegy: he had been "the most charming and the most promising' of his contemporaries; "his mind was more original & powerful than the minds of us his contemporaries"; "he had a genius for metaphysical analysis", "a peculiar clearness of perception", and an "always active mind"; an "angelic spirit", "he seemed to tread the earth as a spirit from some better world"; "his mighty spirit (beautiful and powerful as it had already grown), yet bore all the marks of youth, and growth, and ripening promise."

Tennyson said: "He would have been known, if he had lived, as a great man but not as a great poet; he was as near perfection as mortal man could be."

Gladstone hoped "that some part of what Hallam has written may be [...] put into a more durable form [...] his letters I think are worthy of permanent preservation". Hallam's father collected together many of his son's writings – excluding his letters and poems he thought unsuitable – and published them privately: Remains in Verse and Prose of Arthur Henry Hallam (1834). On being asked by Henry Hallam to contribute to an introduction, Tennyson replied: "I attempted to draw a memoir of his life and character, but I failed to do him justice. I failed even to please myself. I could scarcely have pleased you."

Hallam is buried at St Andrew's Church, Clevedon, Somerset.

== In Memoriam ==
That Hallam's death was a significant influence on Tennyson's poetry is clear. Tennyson dedicated one of his most popular poems to Hallam (In Memoriam), and stated that the dramatic monologue Ulysses was "more written with the feeling of his [Hallam's] loss upon me than many poems in [the publication] In Memoriam". Tennyson named his elder son after his late friend. Emilia Tennyson also named her elder son, Arthur Henry Hallam, in his honour. Francis Turner Palgrave dedicated to Tennyson his Golden Treasury of Songs and Lyrics (MacMillan 1861), declaring in the Preface that "It would have been hence a peculiar pleasure and pride to dedicate what I have endeavoured to make a true national Anthology of three centuries to Henry Hallam". It can be argued that some of Tennyson's other works are linked to Hallam, for example, Break, Break, Break, Mariana, and The Lady of Shalott.

== See also ==
- Thomas Chatterton
