= Emilia Tennyson =

Sister of Lord Tennyson

Emilia Tennyson (1811–1887), known simply as Emily within her family, was a younger sister of Alfred, Lord Tennyson, and the fiancée of Arthur Henry Hallam, for whom Tennyson's poem In Memoriam A.H.H. was written. Emilia met Hallam through her brother, and they became engaged in 1832.

== Loss and marriage ==
However, the couple were never to marry, as Hallam died suddenly while travelling abroad in 1833. There was much concern for Emily's well-being on the death of Arthur.

She later married Richard Jesse, then a midshipman in the British Royal Navy, who later rose to the rank of captain. Their marriage came as a considerable shock to Jane Elton, Arthur's cousin. Jesse probably died two years after his wife, in 1889. Their eldest son was given the forenames Arthur Henry Hallam. Another son, the Reverend Eustace Tennyson D'Eyncourt Jesse, was the father of the writer F. Tennyson Jesse.

== Cultural reference ==
Emilia Tennyson appears as a character in the story "Conjugial [sic] Angel" by A. S. Byatt in the book Angels and Insects.
