= In Memoriam A.H.H. =

1850 poem by Tennyson

In Memoriam
- by Alfred, Lord Tennyson
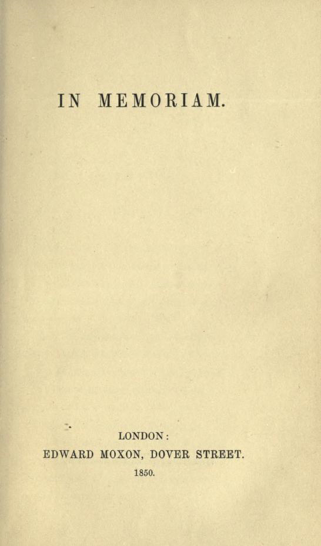
- Title page of 1st edition (1850)
- Original title: IN MEMORIAM A. H. H. OBIIT MDCCCXXXIII
- Country: United Kingdom
- Language: English
- Genre(s): Requiem, elegy
- Rhyme scheme: abba
- Publication date: 1850
- Lines: 2916

Full text
- In Memoriam (Tennyson) at Wikisource

In Memoriam A.H.H. (1850) by Alfred, Lord Tennyson, is an elegy for his Cambridge friend Arthur Henry Hallam, who died of cerebral haemorrhage in Vienna, at the age of twenty-two years, in 1833. As a sustained exercise in tetrametric lyrical verse, Tennyson's poetical reflections extend beyond the meaning of the death of Hallam. In Memoriam also explores the random cruelty of Nature seen from the conflicting perspectives of materialist science and the declining Christian faith of the Victorian era (1837–1901). The poem is thus an elegy, a requiem, and a dirge for a friend, a time, and a place.

== History ==
In Memoriam A.H.H. (1850) is an elegiac, narrative poem in 2,916 lines of iambic tetrameter, composed in 133 cantos, each canto headed with a Roman numeral, and organised in three parts: (i) the prologue, (ii) the poem, and (iii) the epilogue. After seventeen years (1833 to 1850) of composing, writing, and editing, Tennyson anonymously published the poem under the Latin title In Memoriam A.H.H. Obiit MDCCCXXXIII (In Memoriam A.H.H. 1833). Upon the literary, artistic, and commercial success of the poem, Tennyson further developed it and added Canto LIX: 'O Sorrow, wilt thou live with me' to the 1851 edition; and then added Canto XXXIX: 'Old warder of these buried bones' to the 1871 edition. The epilogue concludes In Memoriam with an epithalamium, a nuptial poem for the poet's sister, Cecilia Tennyson, on her wedding to the academic Edmund Law Lushington, in 1842.

== The poem ==
=== Metrical form ===
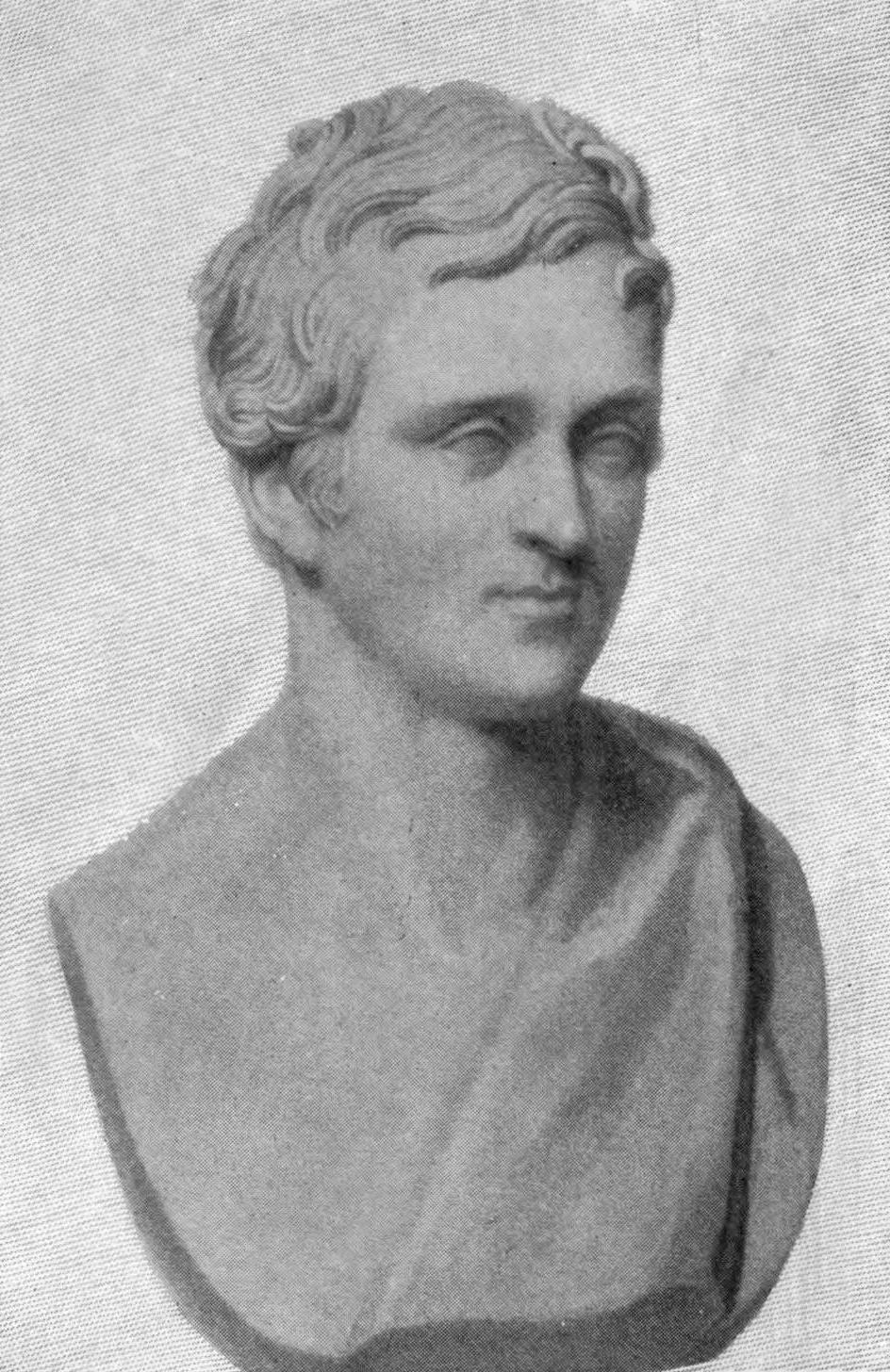
The poet Arthur Henry Hallam (1811–1833), whom Tennyson mourned with the poem In Memoriam A.H.H. (1850). (Bust by Francis Leggatt Chantrey)

Written in iambic tetrameter (four-line ABBA stanzas), the poetical metre of In Memoriam A.H.H. creates the tonal effects of the sounds of grief and mourning. In 133 cantos, including the prologue and the epilogue, Tennyson uses the stylistic beats of tetrameter to address the subjects of spiritual loss and themes of nostalgia, philosophic speculation, and Romantic fantasy in service to mourning the death of his friend, the poet A. H. Hallam; thus, in Canto IX, Tennyson describes the return of the corpse to England: "Fair ship, that from the Italian shore / Saileth the placid ocean-plains / With my lost Arthur's remains, / Spread thy full wings and waft him o'er".

=== Themes ===
As a man of the Victorian age (1837–1901) and as a poet, Tennyson addressed the intellectual matters of his day, such as the theory of the transmutation of species presented in the anonymously published book Vestiges of the Natural History of Creation (1844), a speculative natural history about the negative theological implications of Nature functioning without divine direction. Moreover, 19th-century Evangelicalism experienced some tensions with scientific discoveries; thus, in Canto CXXIX, Tennyson alludes to "the truths that never can be proved" – the Victorian belief that reason and intellect would reconcile science with religion.

In Canto LV, the poet asks:

Are God and Nature then at strife,
That Nature lends such evil dreams?
So careful of the type she seems,
So careless of the single life;

That I, considering everywhere
Her secret meaning in her deeds,
And finding that of fifty seeds
She often brings but one to bear,

I falter where I firmly trod,
And falling with my weight of cares
Upon the great world's altar-stairs
That slope thro' darkness up to God,

I stretch lame hands of faith, and grope,
And gather dust and chaff, and call
To what I feel is Lord of all,
And faintly trust the larger hope.

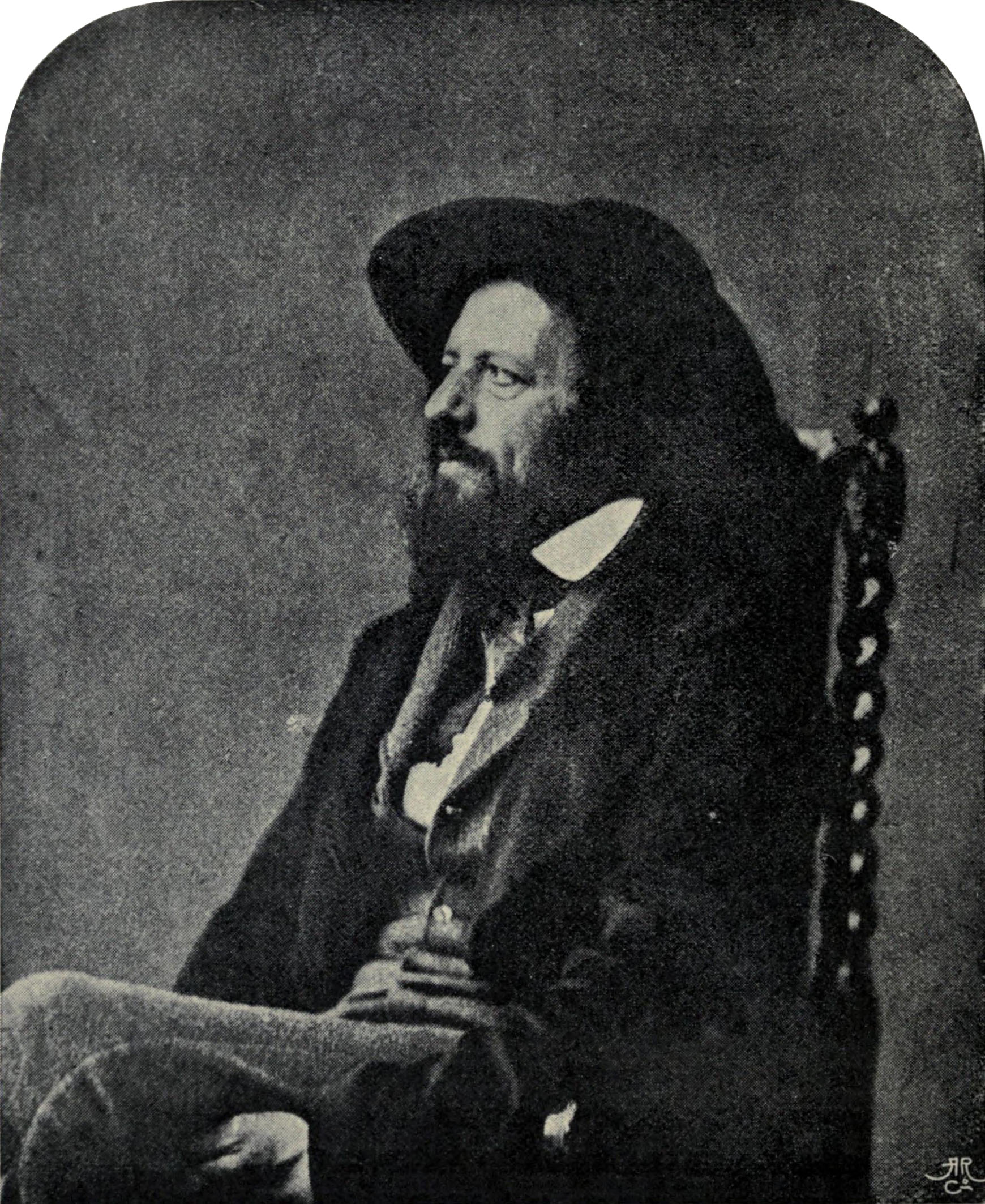
Alfred, Lord Tennyson, photographed in 1857.

In Canto LVI, the poet queries Nature about the existential circumstance of Man on planet Earth:

Who trusted God was love indeed
And love Creation's final law —
Tho' Nature, red in tooth and claw
With ravine, shriek'd against his creed —
Who loved, who suffer'd countless ills,
Who battled for the True, the Just,
Be blown about the desert dust,
Or seal'd within the iron hills?"

Moreover, although Tennyson published "In Memoriam A.H.H." (1850) nine years before Charles Darwin published the book On the Origin of Species (1859), contemporary advocates for the theory of natural selection had adopted the poetical phrase Nature, red in tooth and claw (Canto LVI) to support their humanist arguments for the theory of human evolution.

In Canto CXXII, Tennyson addresses the conflict between conscience and theology:

If e'er when faith had fallen asleep,
I hear a voice 'believe no more'
And heard an ever-breaking shore
That tumbled in the Godless deep;

A warmth within the breast would melt
The freezing reason's colder part,
And like a man in wrath the heart
Stood up and answer'd 'I have felt.'

No, like a child in doubt and fear:
But that blind clamour made me wise;
Then was I as a child that cries,
But, crying knows his father near;

The conclusion of the poem reaffirmed Tennyson's religiosity, his progress from doubt-and-despair to faith-and-hope, which he realised by mourning the death of his friend, Arthur Henry Hallam (1811–1833).

=== Personal themes ===
The literary scholar Christopher Ricks relates the following lines, from canto XCIX, to the end of Tennyson's boyhood at the Somersby Rectory, Lincolnshire, especially the boy's leaving Somersby upon the death of his father.

In Canto XCIX, the poet writes:

Unwatched, the garden bough shall sway,
The tender blossom flutter down,
Unloved, that beech will gather brown,
This maple burn itself away.

== Quotations ==
The poem has yielded many literary quotations:

In Canto XXVII:

I hold it true, whate'er befall;
I feel it when I sorrow most;
'Tis better to have loved and lost
Than never to have loved at all.

In Canto LIV:

So runs my dream, but what am I?
An infant crying in the night
An infant crying for the light
And with no language but a cry.

In Canto LVI:

Who trusted God was love indeed
And love Creation's final law
Tho' Nature, red in tooth and claw
With ravine, shriek'd against his creed

In Canto CXXIII:

The hills are shadows, and they flow
From form to form, and nothing stands;
They melt like mist, the solid lands,
Like clouds they shape themselves and go.

Concerning the natural science of the time, in Canto CXXIII, Tennyson reports that "The hills are shadows, and they flow / From form to form, and nothing stands" in reference to the then-recent discovery, in the 19th century, that planet Earth was geologically active and far older than believed a century earlier.

== Legacy ==
=== Queen Victoria ===
In Memoriam was a favourite poem of Queen Victoria, who after the death of her husband, the Prince Consort Albert, was "soothed & pleased" by the feelings explored in Tennyson's poem. In 1862 and in 1883, Queen Victoria met Tennyson to tell him she much liked his poetry.

=== Novels ===
In the novel The Tragedy of the Korosko (1898), by Arthur Conan Doyle, characters quote the poem by citing Canto LIV of In Memoriam: "Oh yet we trust that somehow good / will be the final goal of ill"; and by citing Canto LV: I falter where I firmly trod"; whilst another character says that Lord Tennyson's In Memoriam is "the grandest and the deepest and the most inspired [poem] in our language".

The 1924 short story "A Neighbour's Landmark" by M. R. James quotes the line "With no language but a cry" from In Memoriam A.H.H..

Alan Hollinghurst, in his novel The Stranger's Child (2011), has his central character, the doomed Cecil Valance, quote from Canto CI, in which appear the lines "And year by year the landscape grow / Familiar to the stranger's child".

Alice Winn's novel In Memoriam (2023) mentions In Memoriam throughout the novel, with the principal characters discussing writing their own "In Memoriam" poems for each other if they die in World War I.

=== Musical settings ===
- The cycle of songs Four Songs from In Memoriam (1885), by Maude Valérie White
- The song "There Rolls the Deep" (1897), by Hubert Parry
- Song cycle in 12 sections by Liza Lehmann (1899).
- The cycle of seven songs Under Alter'd Skies (2017), by Jonathan Dove
