= Poems (Tennyson, 1842) =

Anthology by Alfred, Lord Tennyson

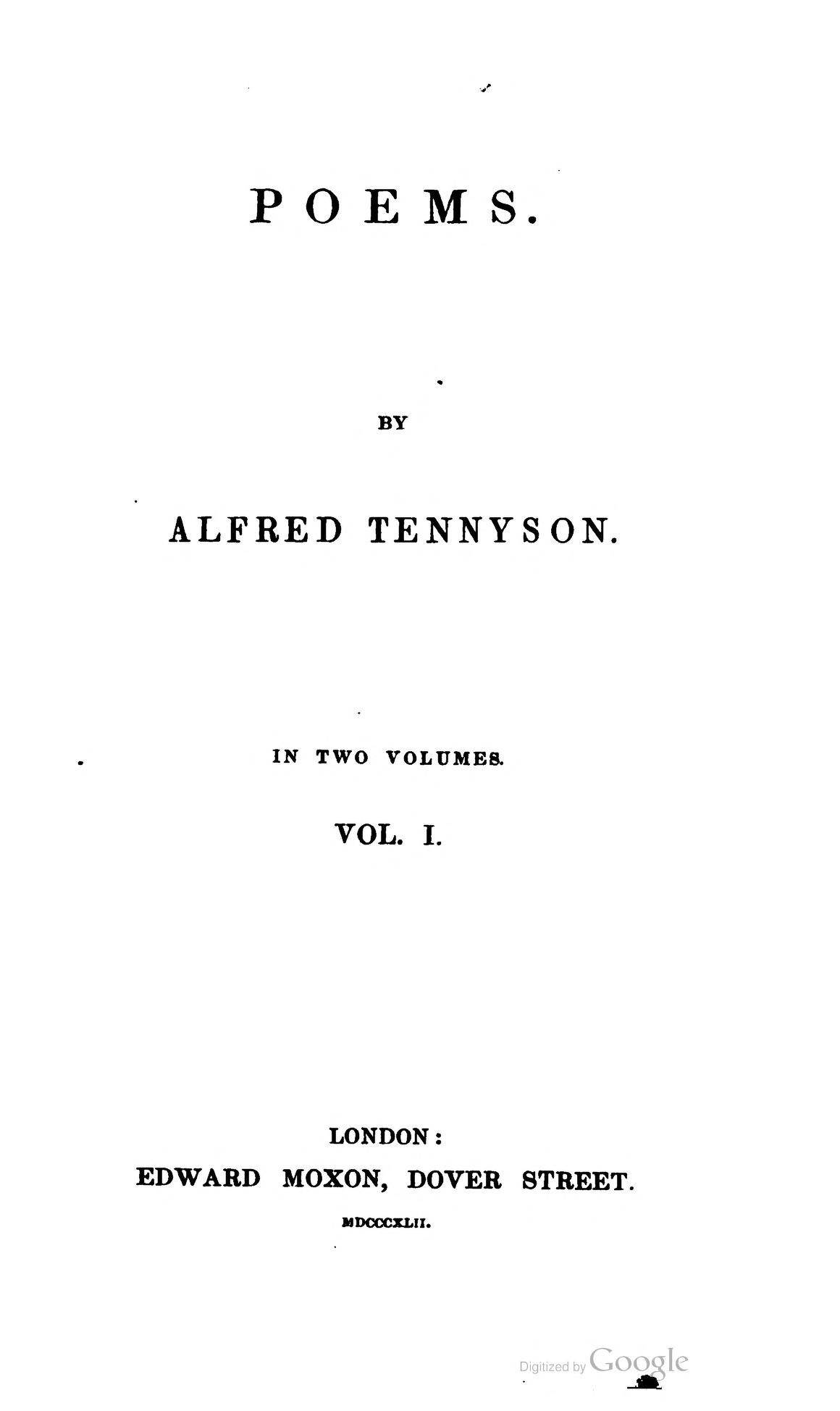
- Cover, circa 1842
- Author: Alfred Tennyson
- Language: English
- Genre: Poetry
- Publication date: 1842
- Publication place: United Kingdom
- Text: Poems at Wikisource

Poems, by Alfred Tennyson, was a two-volume 1842 collection in which new poems and reworked older ones were printed in separate volumes. It includes some of Tennyson's finest and best-loved poems, such as Mariana, The Lady of Shalott, The Palace of Art, The Lotos Eaters, Ulysses, Locksley Hall, The Two Voices, Sir Galahad, and Break, Break, Break. It helped to establish his reputation as one of the greatest poets of his time.

== Contents ==
=== Volume 1 ===
- Claribel
- Lilian
- Isabel
- Mariana
- To ——
- Madeline
- Song—The Owl
- Second Song—To the Same
- Recollections of the Arabian Nights
- Ode to Memory
- Song
- Adeline
- A Character
- The Poet
- The Poet's Mind
- The Dying Swan
- A Dirge
- Love and Death
- The Ballad of Oriana
- Circumstance
- The Merman
- The Mermaid
- Sonnet to J. M. K.
- The Lady of Shalott
- Mariana in the South
- Eleanore
- The Miller's Daughter
- Fatima
- Œnone
- The Sisters
- To ——
- The Palace of Art
- Lady Clara Vere de Vere
- The May Queen
- The Lotos Eaters
- A Dream of Fair Women
- Margaret
- The Blackbird
- The Death of the Old Year
- To J. S.
- You Ask Me Why, Though Ill at Ease
- Of Old Sat Freedom on the Heights
- Love Thou Thy Land, with Love Far-Brought
- The Goose

=== Volume 2 ===
- The Epic
- Morte d'Arthur
- The Gardener’s Daughter; or, The Pictures
- Dora
- Audley Court
- Walking to the Mail
- St. Simeon Stylites
- The Talking Oak
- Love and Duty
- Ulysses
- Locksley Hall
- Godiva
- The Two Voices
- The Day-Dream
- Amphion
- St. Agnes
- Sir Galahad
- Edward Gray
- Will Waterproof's Lyrical Monologue
- Lady Clare
- The Lord of Burleigh
- Sir Launcelot and Queen Guinevere
- A Farewell
- The Beggar Maid
- The Vision of Sin
- The Skipping Rope
- Move Eastward, Happy Earth, and Leave
- Break, Break, Break
- The Poet's Song

== Revisions ==
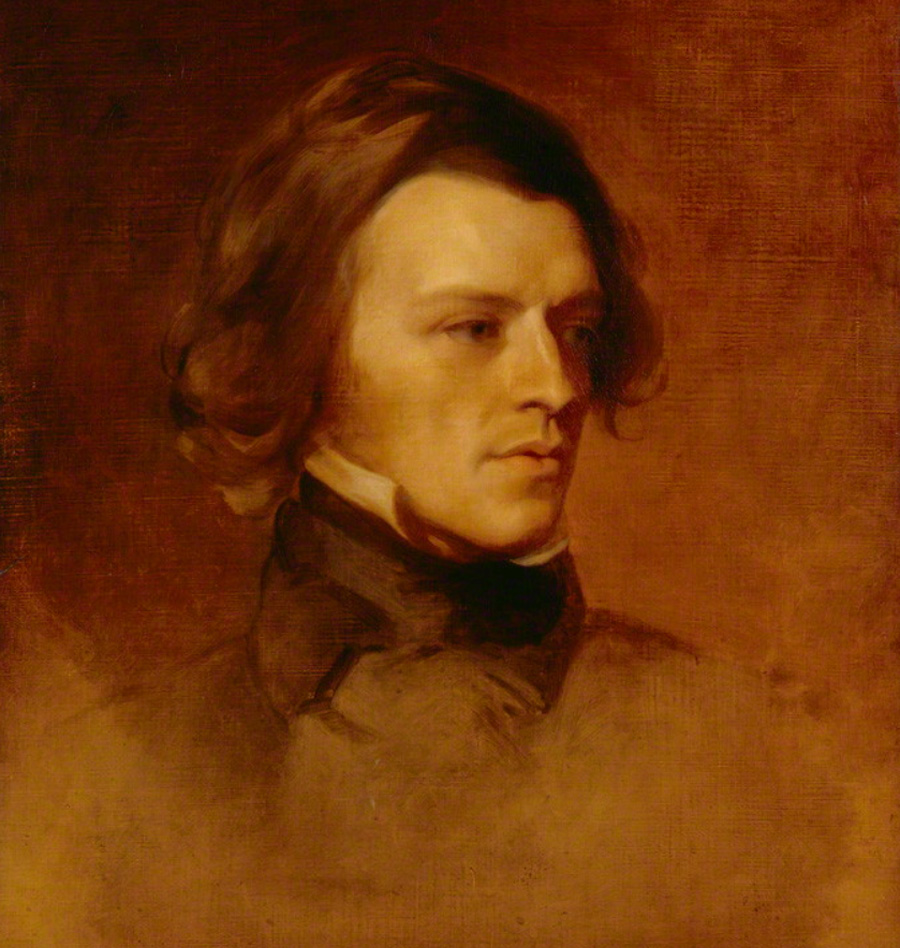
Tennyson in 1840, by Samuel Laurence

The first volume of the book consists of poems taken from his 1830 Poems, Chiefly Lyrical and 1832 (the imprint reads 1833) Poems, and the second consists of new work. Tennyson had been severely stung by the more hostile reviews of the 1832 book, which had found some of his poems silly, affected and obscure. He meant to reinstate himself in critical esteem, and to this end he very heavily revised the best of his earlier work, often following the reviewers’ detailed criticisms. This in many cases, such as Œnone and The Lady of Shalott, resulted in greatly improved versions. In the new poems contained in the second volume he also took to heart the general tenor of the advice his critics had given. By 1840 the work of revision and composition was complete, or virtually so. The increasing danger of his earlier poems being pirated in their unrevised forms in America impelled him to forestall that threat by finding a publisher, and in March 1842, partly at his friend Edward FitzGerald's insistence, a contract was signed with Edward Moxon.

== Publication ==
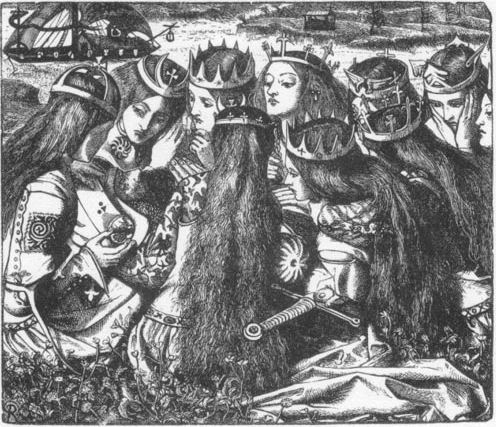
Dante Gabriel Rossetti illustration for the 10th edition

A first edition of 800 copies was published by Moxon on 14 May, of which 500 copies had been sold by September. An edition was published in Boston the same year by the firm of W. D. Ticknor, who sent Tennyson one of the first copyright payments made by any American publisher to a British writer. Home sales were from the start highly encouraging, and his two-thirds profit agreement with Moxon earned Tennyson more than £600 during the first four years, alleviating his serious financial difficulties. As succeeding editions came out Tennyson began to add more poems, such as Come Not When I Am Dead and The Eagle. The 10th edition, in 1857, was illustrated by Rossetti, Millais, Holman Hunt and others, and by 1868 a 19th edition had appeared.

== Reception ==
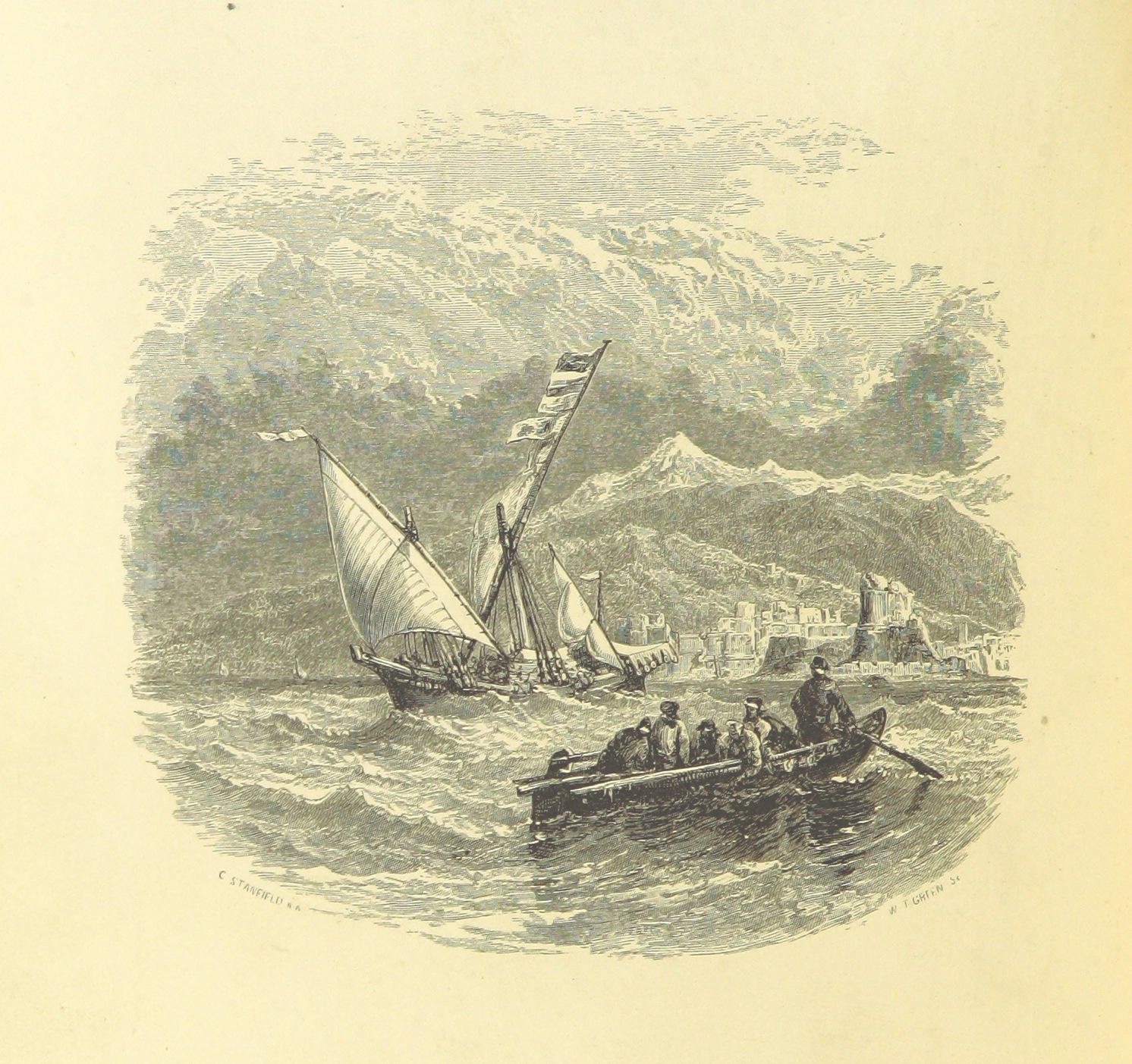
Clarkson Frederick Stanfield illustration for the 10th edition

Tennyson's friends were enthusiastic about the new poems included in the second volume. Thomas Carlyle found it "infinitely gratifying to find one true soul more, a great melodious Poet-soul, breathing the vital air along with us. Such I discover, to my own satisfaction, is this Book of Alfred's." Edward FitzGerald thought it "such a volume as has not been published since the time of Keats: and which…will never be suffered to die", but when it came to the old poems in the first volume he deplored the inclusion of "the Merman, the Mermaid, and those everlasting Eleanores, Isabels, – which always were, and are, and must be, a nuisance". Robert Browning deplored the revisions there, privately writing that "The alterations are insane. Whatever is touched is spoiled." The reviewers differed from him on this point; indeed their reaction to the whole book was generally favourable, and not only because several of them were personal friends of Tennyson. Leigh Hunt, in the Church of England Quarterly Review, praised the book and called Tennyson "a kind of philosophical Keats". James Spedding wanted to see a long poem from him; he also, along with John Sterling and the anonymous reviewer in the Atlas, thought that human sympathy was the strong point of the volume. On the other hand the Christian Remembrancer believed Tennyson "had not yet become human enough", and similarly the Westminster Review, the London University Magazine and Hogg's Weekly Instructor urged him to draw on the sympathies of his own personal experiences. Many reviewers encouraged him to introduce more contemporary relevance and didacticism into his poems, rather than indulging his Romantic temperament. There was widespread agreement that the best poems were those dealing with domestic life, even when they were somewhat trite. The overall outcome of the publication of Poems was that Tennyson began to be taken much more seriously than he had previously been, with many seeing him as the leading poet of the younger generation, worthy of one day being made Poet Laureate.
