= Mariana (poem) =

Poem by Alfred, Lord Tennyson

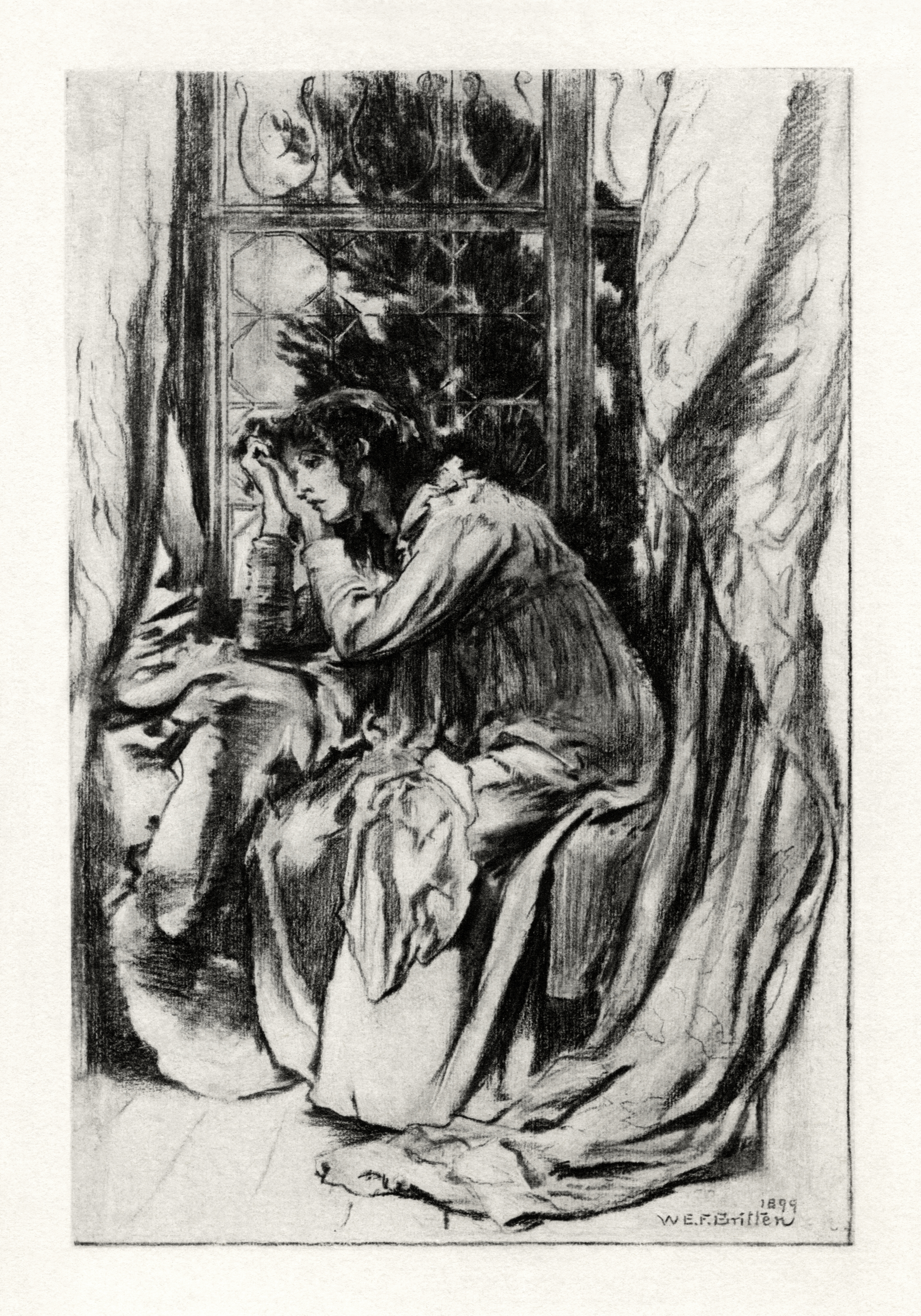
Illustration by W. E. F. Britten

"Mariana" is a poem by Alfred, Lord Tennyson, published in 1830. The poem follows a common theme in much of Tennyson's work—that of despondent isolation. The subject of "Mariana" is a woman who continuously laments her lack of connection with society. The isolation defines her existence, and her longing for a connection leaves her wishing for death at the end of every stanza. The premise of "Mariana" originates in William Shakespeare's Measure for Measure, but the poem ends before Mariana's lover returns. Tennyson's version was adapted by others, including John Everett Millais and Elizabeth Gaskell, for use in their own works. The poem was well received by critics, and it is described by critics as an example of Tennyson's skill at poetry.

Tennyson wrote "Mariana" in 1830 and printed it within his early collection Poems, Chiefly Lyrical. Previously, he contributed poems to the work Poems by Two Brothers (1827), where his early poems dealing with isolation and memory can be found. The theme was continued in the later collection, with poems like "Mariana", "Ode to Memory", and others representing the earlier poems.

During a visit to the Pyrenees during the summer of 1830, Tennyson sought to give aid to Spanish rebels. During that time, he was affected by his experience and the influence appears in "Mariana in the South", which was published in 1832; it is a later version that follows the idea of "The Lady of Shalott".

== Structure ==
Many of Tennyson's poems are in the form of a dramatic monologue. However, "Mariana", like "The Lady of Shalott", is more accurately a lyrical narrative. It contains elements of dramatic monologues in that it contains a refrain that carries through the poem as found in "Oriana" and other poems. "Oriana" is completely a dramatic monologue and "Mariana" is not because Tennyson represents how the title figure is unable to linguistically control her own poem, which reinforces the themes of the poem. This technique is used again in Tennyson's later poem, "The Two Voices". The rhyme scheme of the poem, ABAB CDDC EFEF, is different from the standard ballad rhyme that serves to contain the poem then allow a free expression. The middle quatrain of the stanzas returns in theme to the beginning in a cyclical pattern while the last quatrain's lines contain the same words.

== Poem ==
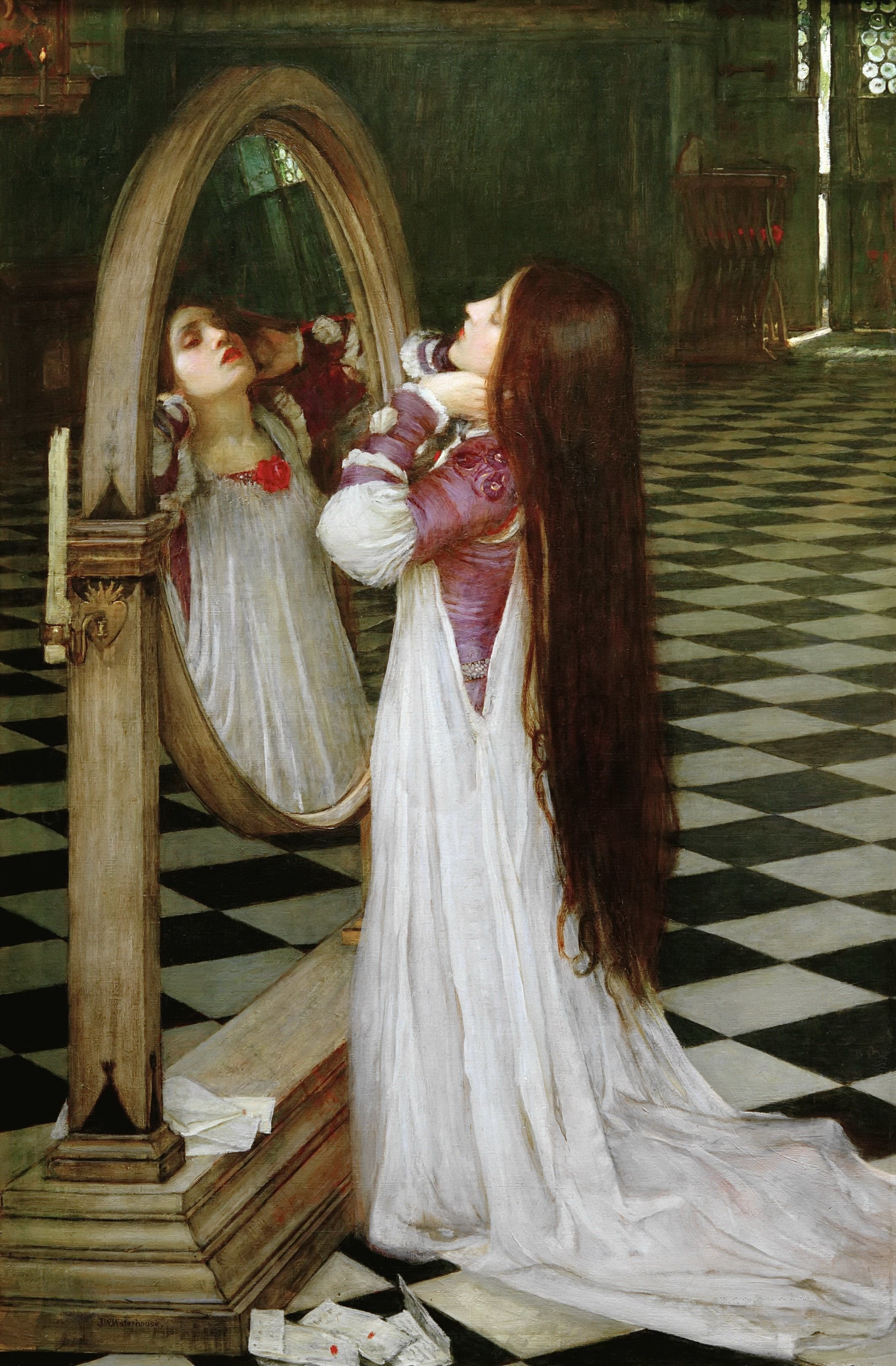
Mariana in the South by John William Waterhouse (1897)

Within the poem, Tennyson does not teach the audience what melancholy means. Instead, he describes its various aspects as he begins:

With blackest moss the flower-plots
Were thickly crusted, one and all:
The rusted nails fell from the knots
That held the pear to the gable-wall.
The broken sheds looked sad and strange:
Unlifted was the clinking latch;
Weeded and worn the ancient thatch
Upon the lonely moated grange.
She only said, "My life is dreary,
He cometh not," she said;
She said, "I am aweary, aweary;
I would that I were dead!"

— lines 1–12

The narrator of the poem is disconnected from Mariana, and he is able to see what she cannot. In particular, he is able to describe the "sweet heaven" whereas Mariana refuses to take in the scene as well as she is unable to understand the movement of time:

Her tears fell with the dews at even;
Her tears fell ere the dews were dried;
She could not look on the sweet heaven,
Either at morn or eventide.

— lines 13–16

She is surrounded by stillness and there is little movement within the poem. The water is calm and there is only the growth of moss:

About a stone-cast from the wall
A sluice with blackened waters slept,
And o'er it many, round and small,
The clustered marish-mosses crept.

— lines 37–40

Mariana is trapped by her surroundings, and the last stanza begins with her becoming sensitive to sound as she starts to mentally lose her place in reality:

The sparrow's chirrup on the roof,
The slow clock ticking, and the sound
Which to the wooing wind aloof
The poplar made, did all confound
Her sense;

— lines 73–77

The poem ends with a description that even the sunlight is unable to do anything more than reveal dust in her home:

but most she loathed the hour
When the thick-moted sunbeam lay
Athwart the chambers, and the day
Was sloping toward his western bower.

— lines 77–80

The poem ends with an altered version of the refrain, which serves to show that although she wishes her death she is still alive and, in the final moment, allows her to end the poem instead of allowing the poem to end her:

Then, said she, "I am very dreary,
He will not come," she said;
She wept, "I am aweary, aweary,
O God, that I were dead!"

— lines 81–84

== Themes ==
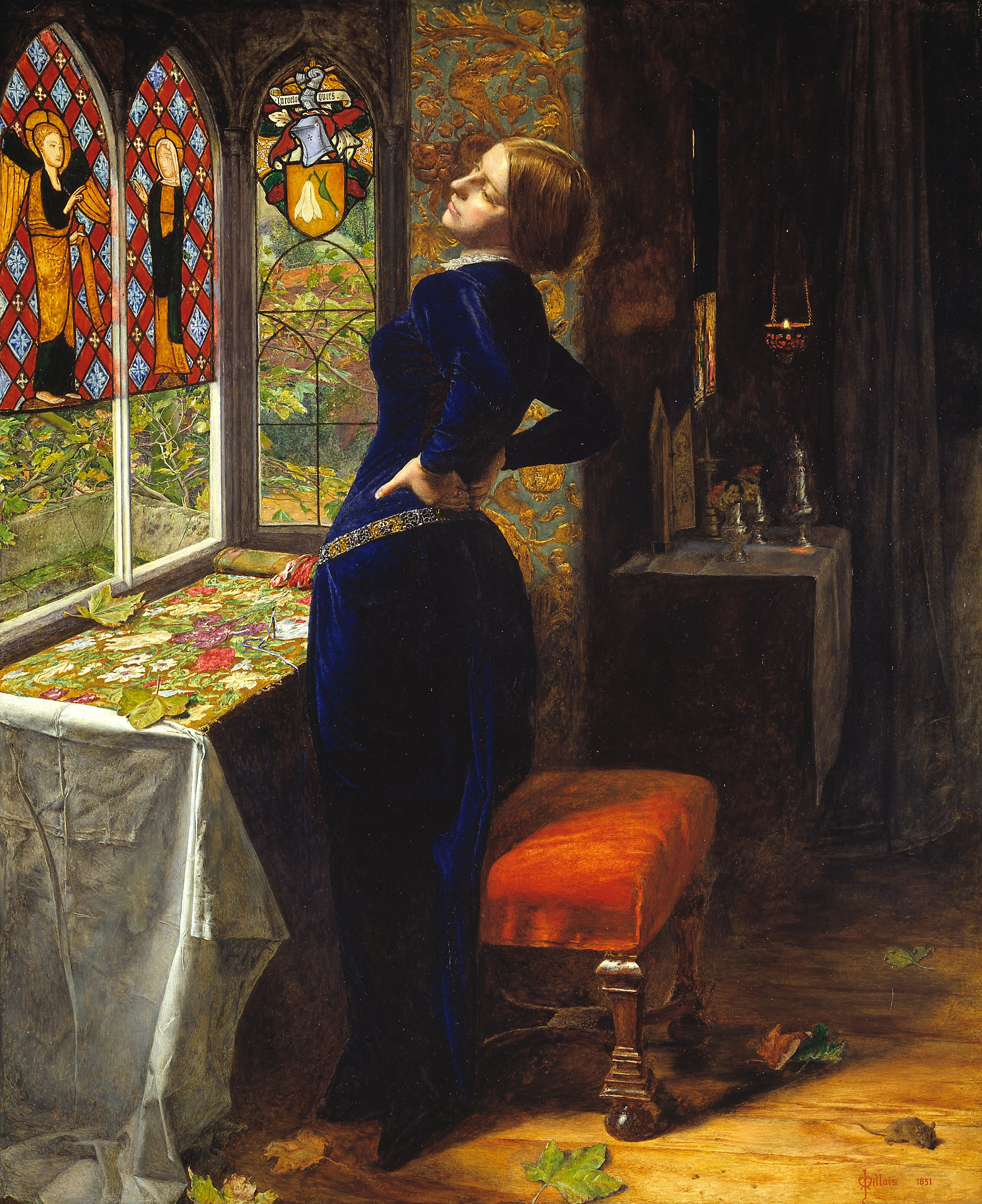
Mariana by John Everett Millais (1851).

Tennyson's poems traditionally rely on the use of visual imagery for effect. In "Mariana", Tennyson instead emphasises auditory imagery that serves to emphasise her solitude. Her hearing is sensitive and she is able to hear every sound, which only reveals the silence of her surroundings. Her solitude and loneliness causes her to be unable to recognise the beauty of her surroundings, and the world to her is dreary. In contrast to Tennyson's other poems, including "The Lady of Shalott", there is no movement within "Mariana". There is also a lack of a true ending within the poem, unlike the later version Mariana in the South, which reworks the poem so there is a stronger conclusion that can be found within death.

The character of Mariana is connected to Shakespeare's Measure for Measure; there is a direct quotation of Shakespeare's play in regards to a character of the same name. In Shakespeare's play, Mariana is rejected by the character Angelo and lives alone as she pines over her love. Tennyson's version is set in Lincolnshire, not Vienna as in the Shakespeare play. This makes the characters completely English. Additionally, the scene within the poem does not have any of the original context but the two works are connected in imagery with the idea of a dull life and a dejected female named Mariana.

Tennyson is not the only one that uses the image; John Everett Millais's 1851 painting Mariana is based on Tennyson's version of Mariana, and lines 9 through 12 of Tennyson's poem were used for the catalogue description of the painting. Similarly, Millais's version served as the inspiration for Elizabeth Gaskell's novel, Ruth. Tennyson's Mariana and Gaskell's main character, Ruth, are sensitive to the sounds around them and are constantly looking out of their window in image that represents their imprisonment within their homes. The image of Mariana used by Tennyson and the later works are equally of a woman who is weary.

The depictions of Mariana by Tennyson and in later works are not the same. The difference with Millais's depiction is not in the image of a forlorn woman or of a woman who is unwilling to live an independent life; instead, it is her sexualised depiction that is greater than found in Tennyson. His version also removes the dreariness of Tennyson's and replaces it with a scene filled with vibrant colours. Gaskell's depiction is of Ruth is similar to Tennyson in her weariness and wanting to die. However, she is a sexually independent figure when she rejects her lover who has returned. Tennyson's character, on the other hand, would likely have happily accepted her lover. While Tennyson's character cannot recognise beauty within nature, Gaskell's character is able to turn to nature to gain spiritually in a manner similar to the Romantic poems, including "Tintern Abbey" by William Wordsworth or "This Lime-Tree Bower My Prison" by Samuel Taylor Coleridge. There is also a connection with Mariana's condition and the condition within Coleridge's Dejection: An Ode. However, the narrator at the end of Dejection is able to be roused into movement whereas Mariana never reaches that point. Furthermore, "Mariana" is unlike the Romantic poems because the character is not one with nature or able to achieve transcendence through imagination. Furthermore, there is little outside of Mariana that exists within the poem as Mariana's mood does not respond to changes in nature.

In terms of Tennyson's other poems, there is a strong connection between the character Mariana and Tennyson's other female characters. Both "Mariana" and "Oriana" have characters that experience a mental imprisonment, which are revealed in the poetic refrains. However, Oriana is able to have control over her own story when she serves as narrator of it while Mariana is denied control by Tennyson's use of a third-person narrative structure. The difference is further compounded by Oriana's imprisonment coming from her own memories while Mariana's is the external results of her lover having not returned. The character Fatima of Fatima is connected to "Mariana" simply because she is a reversal of Mariana's character: Fatima, like Mariana, waits for her lover but suffers from an intense passion that causes her to lose control over her mind while also being able to experience the world around her. The character Oenone of "Oenone" is a combination of aspects from both Mariana's and Fatima's characters. In the revised version Mariana in the South, the second Mariana is similar to the Lady of Shalott in that they both live in a world between fantasy and reality.

== Sources ==
Many sources for the poem and passages within the poem have been suggested by various editors or critics of Tennyson's poet. These sources include passages in the poetry of Sappho and Cinna, Virgil's Aeneid, Horace's Odes, Shakespeare's Romeo and Juliet and Measure for Measure, John Milton's Lycidas, Samuel Rogers's Captivity, and John Keats's Isabella, Sleep and Poetry, and The Eve of St. Agnes. However, there is little evidence to suggest that Keats, though well respected by Tennyson, influenced the poem although Keats's Isabella is linguistically similar to "Mariana" and could serve as a parallel. If Isabella is parallel to "Mariana" in terms of dealing with women who have lost their lovers, so too could Virgil's Aeneid be described as a parallel to the poem.

There is no evidence to suggest that Cinna's poems influenced Tennyson since Tennyson admitted to not having read Cinna. Thematically, "Mariana" is different from the writing of Horace although Tennyson does rely on a lyrical style similar to both Cinna and Horace. A relationship with the poetry of Sappho is more likely than to Cinna, as there is a sexual element to Sappho's poem as well as Tennyson favouring Sappho as a poet. The poem by Rogers was a favourite of Tennyson's and has a sexual element that is similar to Tennyson; both poems describe a woman longing for her lover as she is isolated and in a captive state. There are probably intentional echos of Romeo and Juliet and Measure for Measure within the poem, with the latter play being the source of Mariana's character. The reference to Lycidas is minor and is more likely a generic phrase than a direct use of Milton's poem.

== Critical response ==
In an early review in the 1831 Westminster Review, J. Fox praises the depiction of women within the whole of Poems, Chiefly Lyrical and says that Tennyson's "portraits are delicate, his likenesses [...] perfect, and they have life, character, and individuality. They are nicely assorted also to all the different gradations of emotion and passion which are expressed in common with the descriptions of them. There is an appropriate object for every shade of feeling, from the light touch of passing admiration to the triumphant madness of soul and sense, or the deep and everlasting anguish of survivorship." A review by a "Professor Lyall" in 1878 argues, "As descriptive poetry, and for that feature of realistic description so characteristic of Tennyson's muse, 'Mariana' has, perhaps, not been surpassed even by him."

Harold Nicolson, in 1923, viewed the dreariness of "Mariana" and Tennyson's other early works as an aspect that makes the early works better than his later works. In T. S. Eliot's 1936 Essays Ancient and Modern, he praises Tennyson's ability to represent the visual, tactile, auditory, and olfactory aspects of the scene. Later in 1972, Christopher Ricks argues that the poem is "one of Tennyson's masterpieces in the art of the penultimate".

Elaine Jordan argues, in her 1988 analysis of Tennyson's works, that the poem's depiction of "self-infolding [...] is a negation which involves the drawing-in of forces in order perhaps to assert the self differently. Mariana is the most powerful expression, very early, of such a moment, though its assertiveness exists only as strong gloom in image and rhythm, not as narrative possibility except in the desire for an end to it all preferred over patience." In 2002, Ruth Glancy writes, "In the last stanza, Mariana's grip on the present is loosening, and Tennyson's mastery of sound and images is evident (even in this early poem) in his description of the house that echoes her utter desolation". Anna Barton, in her 2008 analysis, declares Mariana "the most famous heroine of the 1830 volume" and that both The Ballad of Oriana and "Mariana" are "poems of greater substance that develop the poetic that Tennyson begins to establish in his briefer songs".
