= Palace of Art =

Palace of Art may refer to:

- Hall of Art, Budapest, also called Palace of Art
- Palace of Arts, former name of Müpa Budapest, a building in Ferencváros, Budapest, Hungary
- The Palace of Art, a poem by Alfred Lord Tennyson
