= The Lady of Shalott =

1832 ballad by Alfred Tennyson

- by Alfred Tennyson
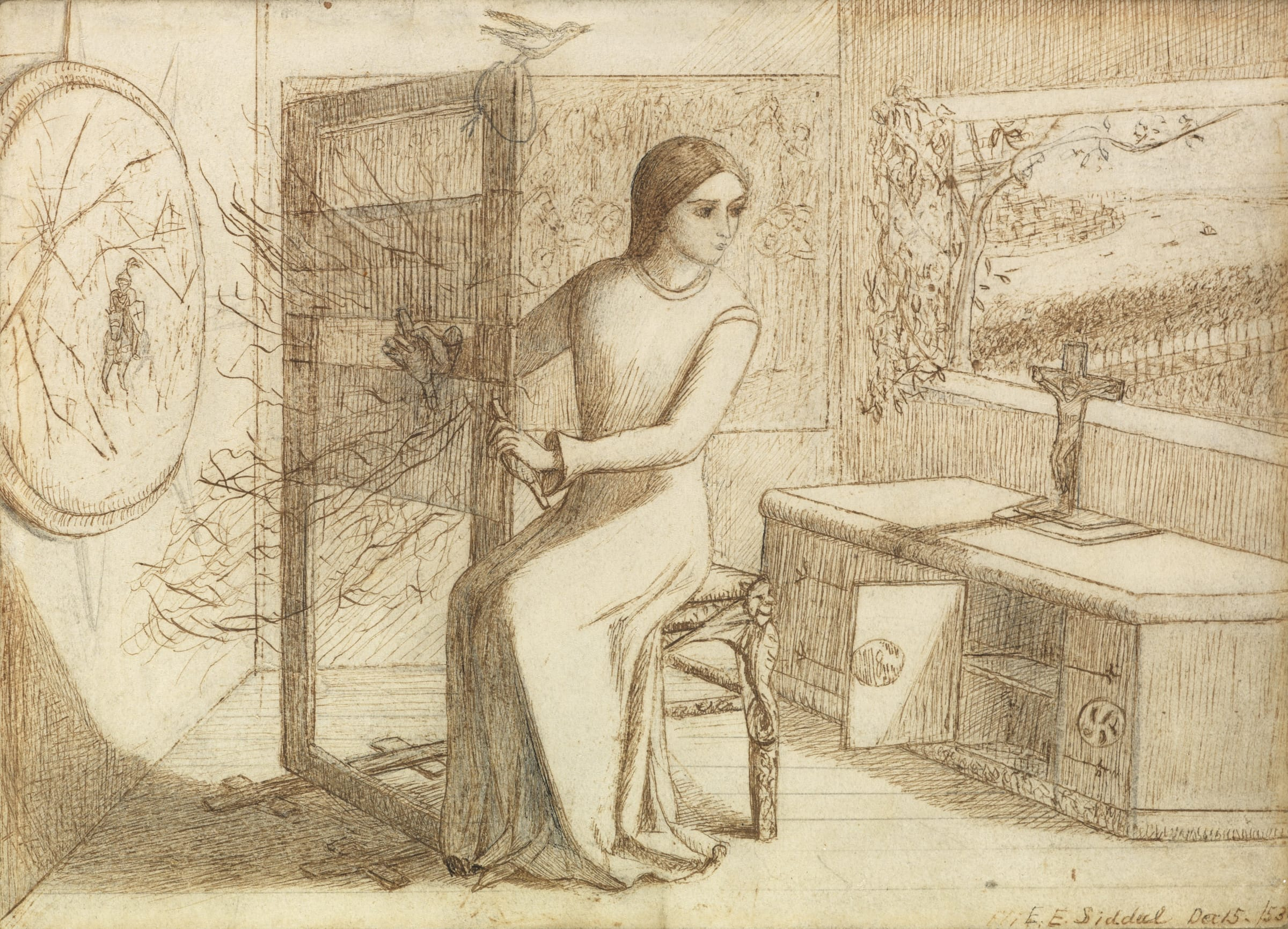
- An 1853 illustration by Elizabeth Siddal
- Written: May 1832, revised in 1842
- Country: United Kingdom
- Language: English
- Genre: Arthurian literature
- Form: Ballad
- Meter: Iambic tetrameter with isolated lines in iambic trimeter
- Rhyme scheme: Aaaabcccb
- Publication date: 1832 & 1842
- Lines: 180 (1832); 171 (1842)

Full text
- The Lady of Shalott at Wikisource

"The Lady of Shalott" (/ʃəˈlɒt/) is a lyrical ballad by the 19th-century English poet Alfred Tennyson and one of his best-known works. Inspired by the 13th-century Italian short prose text La Damigella di Scalot, the poem tells the tragic story of Elaine of Astolat, a young noblewoman stranded in a tower up the river from Camelot. Tennyson wrote two versions of the poem, one published in 1832 (in Poems, incorrectly dated 1833), of 20 stanzas, the other in 1842, of 19 stanzas (also in a book named Poems), and returned to the story in "Lancelot and Elaine". The vivid medieval romanticism and enigmatic symbolism of "The Lady of Shalott" inspired many painters, especially the Pre-Raphaelites and their followers, as well as other authors and artists.

== Background ==
Like Tennyson's other early works, such as "Sir Galahad", the poem recasts Arthurian subject matter loosely based on medieval sources. It is inspired by the legend of Elaine of Astolat, as recounted in a 13th-century Italian novellina titled La Damigella di Scalot, or Donna di Scalotta (No. LXXXII in the collection Il Novellino: Le ciento novelle antike); the earlier version is closer to the source material than the latter. Tennyson focused on the Lady's "isolation in the tower and her decision to participate in the living world, two subjects not even mentioned in Donna di Scalotta." Tennyson also wrote "Lancelot and Elaine", a poem based on Thomas Malory's version of the story from Le Morte d'Arthur, which he included in his Idylls of the King.

== Story ==
The first four stanzas of the 1842 second version of the poem describe a pastoral setting. The Lady of Shalott lives in an island castle in a river which flows to Camelot, but the local farmers know little about her.

And by the moon the reaper weary,
Piling sheaves in uplands airy,
Listening, whispers, "'Tis the fairy
Lady of Shalott."

Stanzas five to eight describe the lady's life. She suffers from a mysterious curse and must continually weave images on her loom without ever looking directly out at the outside world. Instead, she looks into a mirror, which reflects the busy road and the people of Camelot who pass by her island.

She knows not what the curse may be,
And so she weaveth steadily,
And little other care hath she,
The Lady of Shalott.

The reflected images are described as "shadows of the world", a metaphor that makes it clear they are a poor substitute for seeing directly ("I am half-sick of shadows").

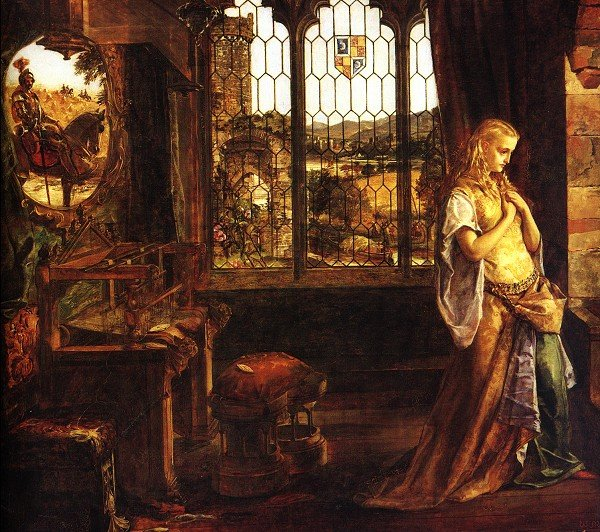
William Maw Egley, The Lady of Shalott, 1858

Stanzas nine to twelve describe "bold Sir Lancelot" as he rides by and is seen by the lady.

All in the blue unclouded weather
Thick-jewell'd shone the saddle-leather,
The helmet and the helmet-feather
Burn'd like one burning flame together,
As he rode down to Camelot.

The remaining seven stanzas describe the effect on the lady of seeing Lancelot; she stops weaving and looks out of her window toward Camelot, bringing about the curse.

Out flew the web and floated wide—
The mirror crack'd from side to side;
"The curse is come upon me," cried
The Lady of Shalott.

She leaves her tower, finds a boat upon which she writes her name, and floats down the river to Camelot. She dies before arriving at the palace. Among the knights and ladies who see her is Lancelot, who thinks she is lovely, and offers a brief prayer for her soul.

"Who is this? And what is here?"
And in the lighted palace near
Died the sound of royal cheer;
And they crossed themselves for fear,
All the Knights at Camelot;
But Lancelot mused a little space
He said, "She has a lovely face;
God in his mercy lend her grace,
The Lady of Shalott."

== Themes ==
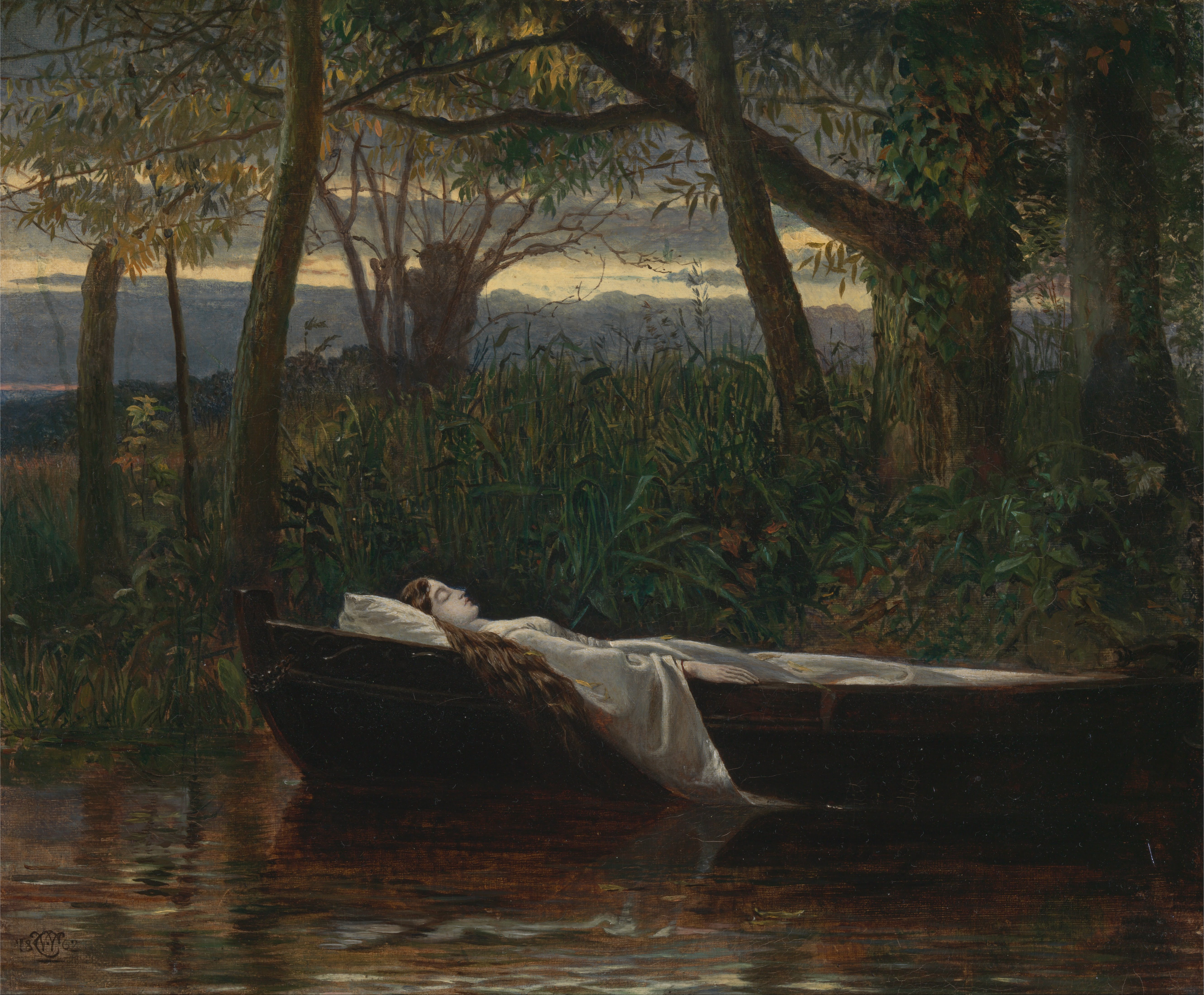
The Lady of Shalott by Walter Crane, 1862

In his biography of Lord Tennyson, David Staines considered that the Arthurian material is "introduced as a valid setting for the study of the artist and the dangers of personal isolation".

Feminist critics see the poem as concerned with issues of women's sexuality and their place in the Victorian world, arguing that "The Lady of Shalott" centres on the temptation of sexuality and her innocence preserved by death. Christine Poulson discusses a feminist viewpoint and suggests "the Lady of Shalott's escape from her tower as an act of defiance, a symbol of female empowerment." Based on Poulson's view, escaping from the tower allows the Lady of Shalott to emotionally break free and come to terms with female sexuality.

The depiction of death has also been interpreted as sleep. Poulson says that sleep has a connotation of physical abandonment and vulnerability, which can either suggest sexual fulfillment or be a metaphor for virginity. Fairy tales, such as "Sleeping Beauty" or "Snow White", have traditionally depended upon this association. So, as related to the Lady of Shalott, Poulson says: "for in death [she] has become a Sleeping Beauty who can never be wakened, symbols of perfect feminine passivity."

== Cultural influence ==
=== Art ===
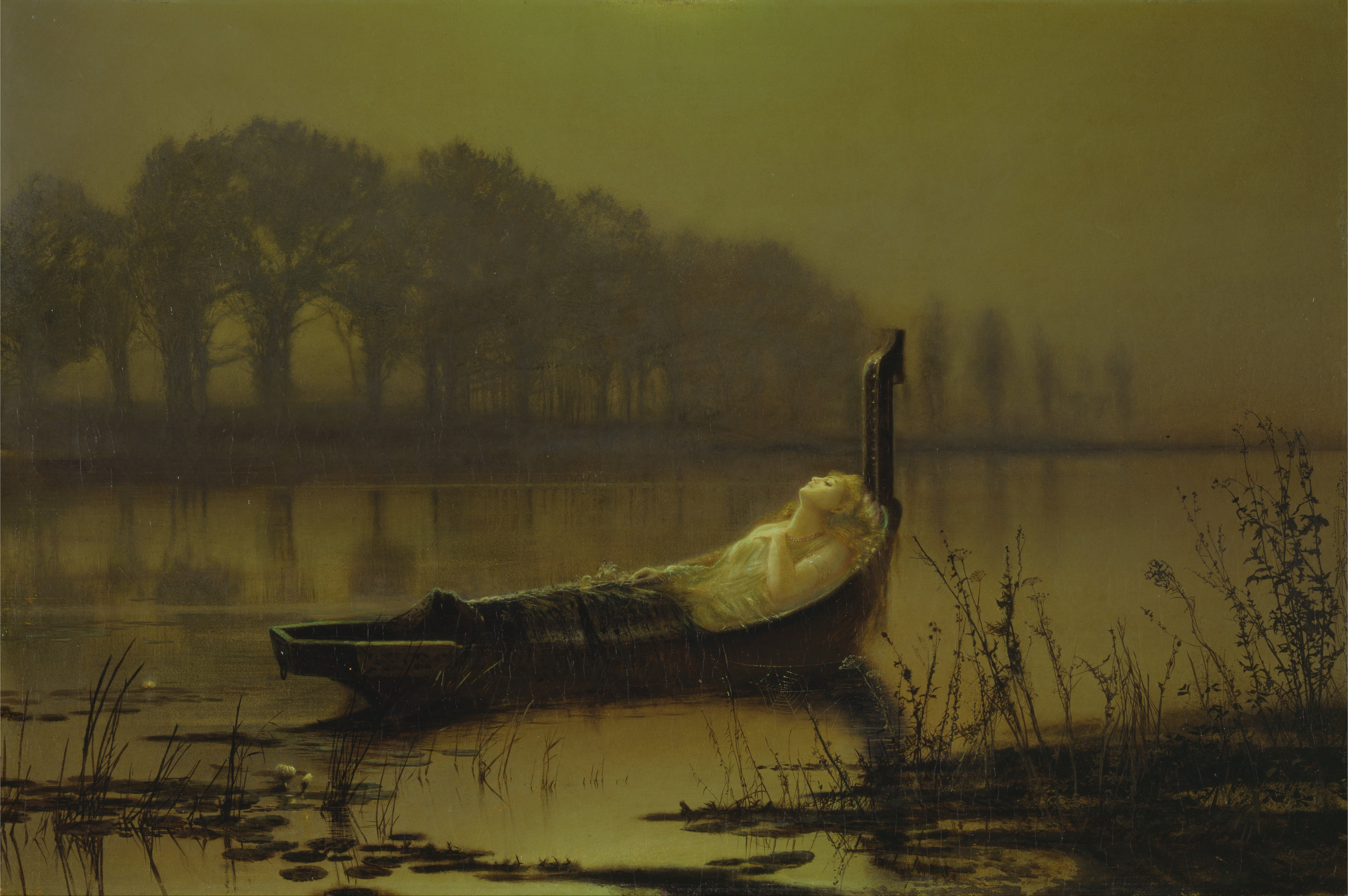
The Lady of Shalott by John Atkinson Grimshaw (1875)

Tennyson's early poetry, with its medievalism and powerful imagery, was a major influence on the Pre-Raphaelite Brotherhood (PRB). According to scholar Anne Zanzucchi, "in a more general sense, it is fair to say that the Pre-Raphaelite fascination with Arthuriana is traceable to Tennyson's work". In 1848, Dante Gabriel Rossetti and William Holman Hunt made a list of "Immortals", artistic heroes whom they admired, especially from literature, some of whose work would form subjects for PRB paintings, notably including John Keats and Tennyson. "The Lady of Shalott" was particularly popular with the Brotherhood, which shared Tennyson's interest in Arthuriana; several of the Brotherhood made paintings based on episodes from the poem. Two aspects, in particular, of "The Lady of Shalott" intrigued these artists: the idea of the lady trapped in her tower and the dying girl floating down the river towards Camelot.

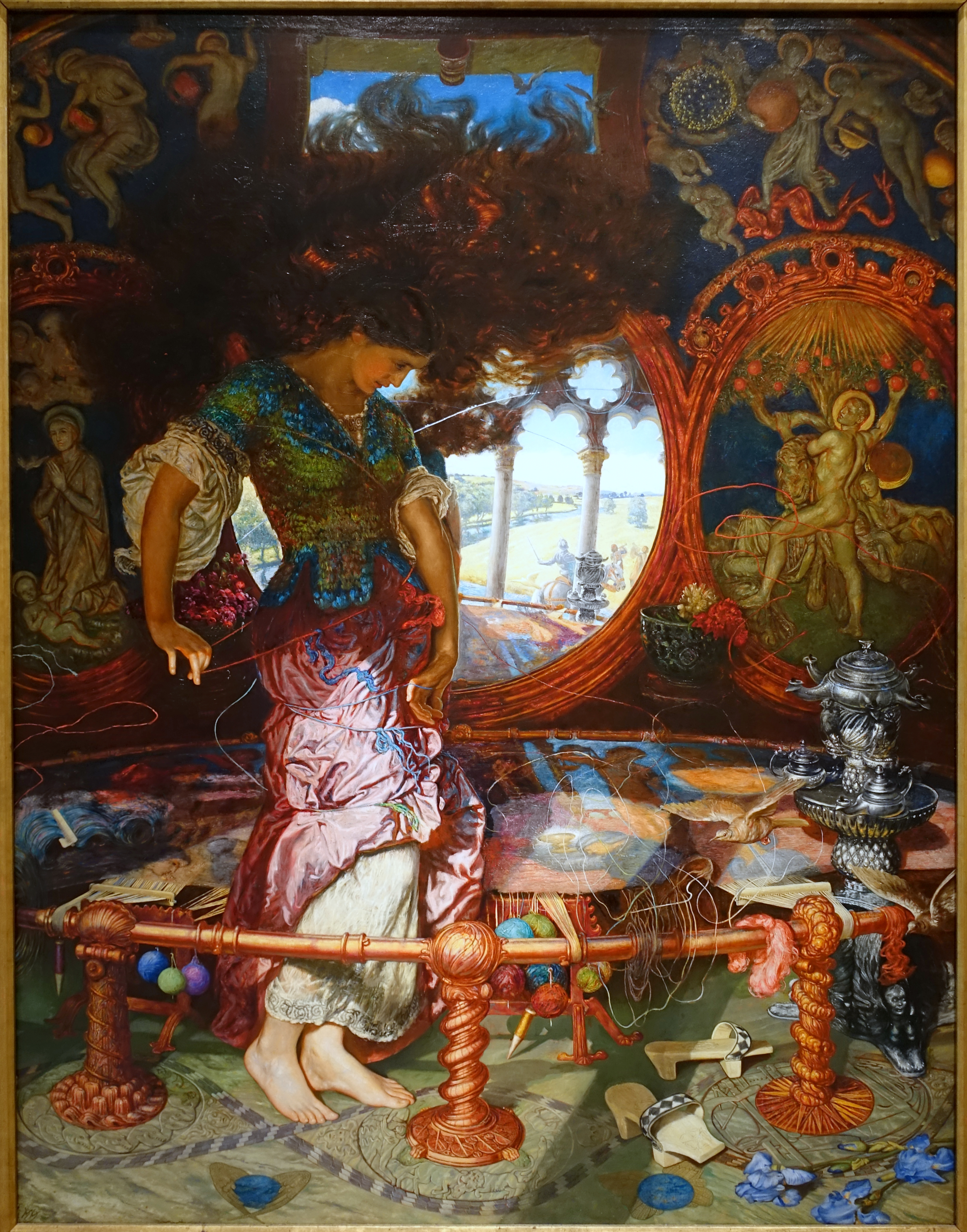
William Holman Hunt's The Lady of Shalott, between 1888 and 1905

In Edward Moxon's 1857 edition of Tennyson's works, illustrated by Hunt and Rossetti, Hunt depicted the moment when the Lady turns to see Lancelot. In the background of the illustration, Hunt juxtaposes the window facing Lancelot with a painting of Christ's crucifixion. According to Christine Poulson, the Crucifixion is the archetype of self-sacrifice and further emphasises the ideal that the Lady of Shalott fails to represent. Poulson also considers this representation of the subject in the context of changing women's roles in the 1880s and 1890s, suggesting that it served as a warning of imminent death to women who stepped from their restricted roles and explored their desires. Rossetti depicted Lancelot's contemplation of the Lady's "lovely face". Neither illustration pleased Tennyson, who took Hunt to task for depicting the Lady caught in the threads of her tapestry, something which is not described in the poem. Hunt explained that he wanted to sum up the whole poem in a single image, and that the entrapment by the threads suggested her "weird fate". The scene fascinated Hunt, who returned to the composition at points throughout his life and finally painted a large scale version shortly before his death. He required assistants, as he was too frail to complete it himself. This deeply conceived evocation of the Lady, ensnared within the perfect rounds of her woven reality, is an apt illustration of the mythology of the weaving arts. This work is now in the collection of the Wadsworth Atheneum Museum of Art in Hartford, Connecticut.

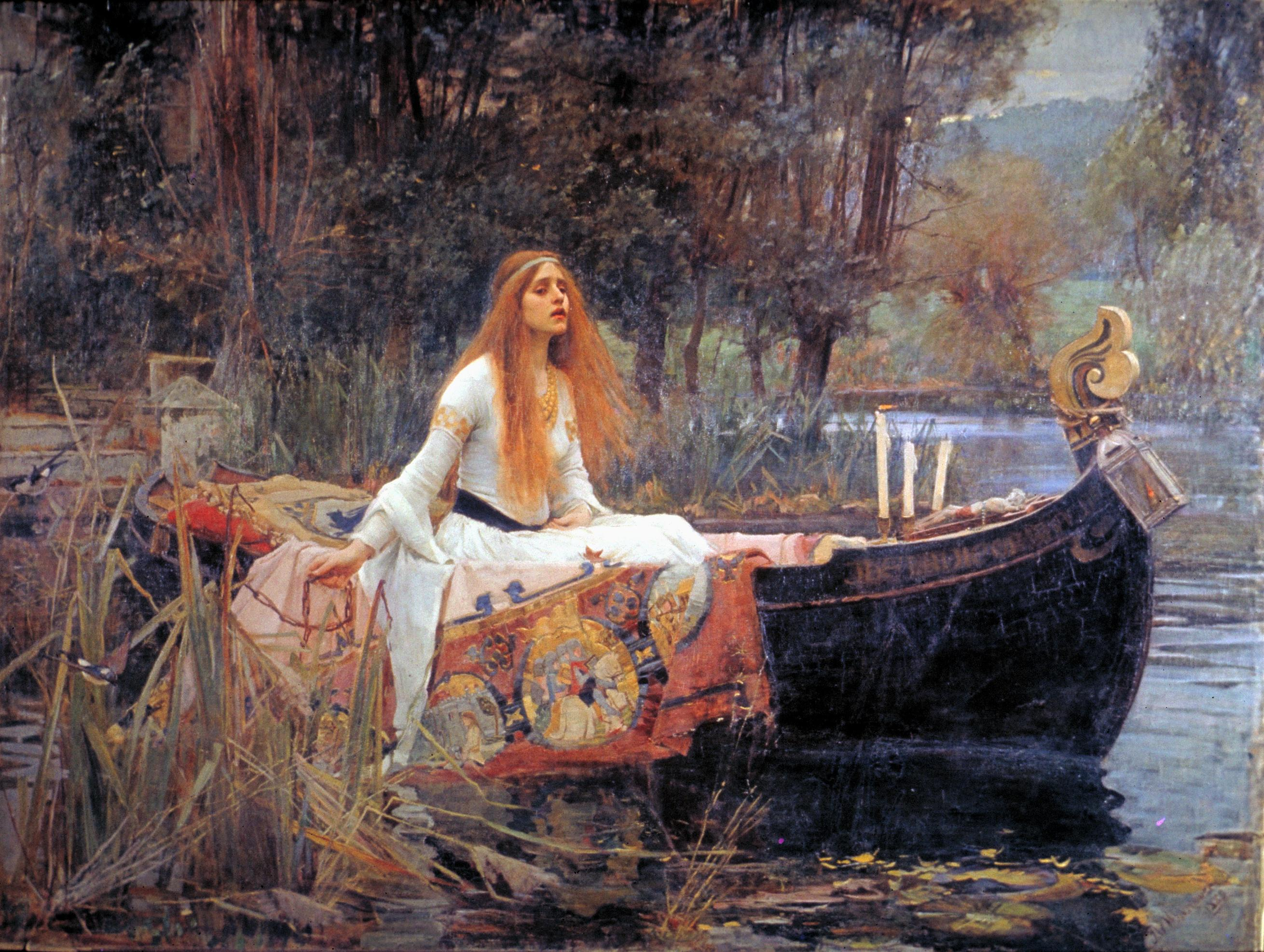
Waterhouse's The Lady of Shalott, 1888

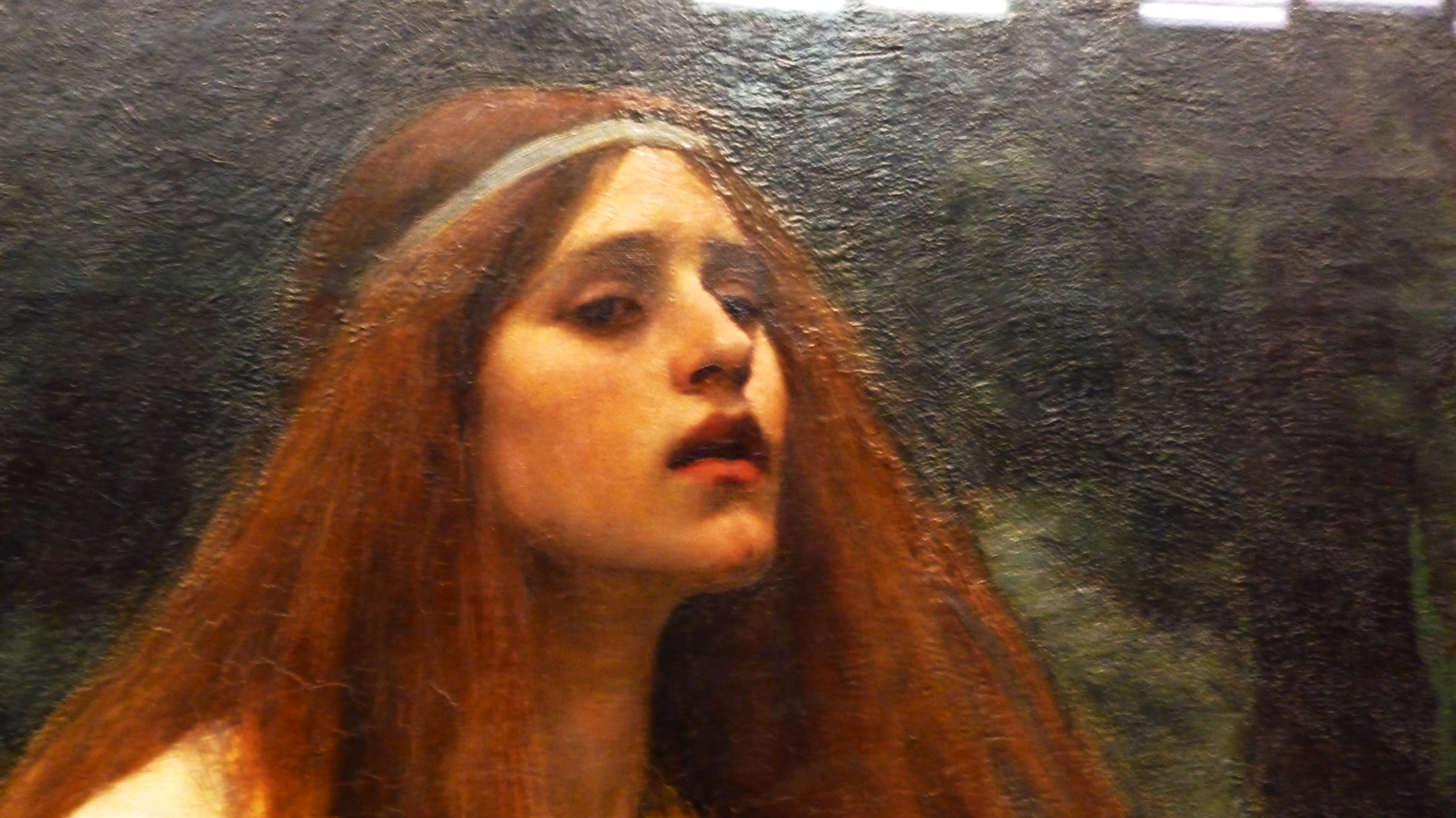
Detail

John William Waterhouse painted three episodes from the poem. In 1888, he painted the Lady setting out for Camelot in her boat; this work is now in Tate Britain. In 1894, Waterhouse painted the Lady at the climactic moment when she turns to look at Lancelot in the window in The Lady of Shalott Looking at Lancelot; this work is now in Leeds Art Gallery. Poulson argues that Waterhouse's impressionistic painting style in his 1894 rendering of The Lady of Shalott evokes a "sense of vitality and urgency". In 1915, Waterhouse painted I Am Half-Sick of Shadows, Said the Lady of Shalott, as she sits wistfully before her loom; this work is now in the Art Gallery of Ontario.

=== Literature ===
"The Lady of Shalott" has been adapted in various ways in later works of literature. Agatha Christie used the line "The mirror crack'd from side to side" as the title of her 1962 novel in which the poem itself plays a large part in the plot. In Lucy Maud Montgomery's Anne of Green Gables (1908), Anne Shirley reads various stanzas of the poem and acts out the Lady of Shalott's tragic end as she floats down the river. Patricia A. McKillip used an adaptation of the poem as a primary theme of her novel The Tower at Stony Wood (2000). Lisa Ann Sandell's novel Song of the Sparrow (2007) is a retelling of the story. Tennyson's poem is also used for narration and as a narrative device in Kaori Yuki's "Camelot Garden" (2008). In Jasper Fforde's novel One of our Thursdays Is Missing (2011), the Lady of Shalott appears as a character, possessing a mirror that allows characters in the Book World to see into the real world ("the Outland"). In Half Sick of Shadows (2021) by Laura Sebastian, Elaine of Shalott is the main character and a close friend and advisor to King Arthur; the story primarily deals with the crowning of Arthur, but Elaine also has the ability to see future events through scrying at her loom. In Bernard Cornwell's Enemy of God (1996), the character of Elaine is conflated with Gwenhwyfach, the younger sister of Gwenhwyfar (Guinevere), who becomes delusional after falling in love with Lancelot.

Quotations from the poem have been included in many novels, including Oscar Wilde's The Picture of Dorian Gray (1890), Eric Frank Russell's Next of Kin (1959), Muriel Spark's The Prime of Miss Jean Brodie (1961), Connie Willis' To Say Nothing of the Dog (1997), and Meg Cabot's Avalon High (2005). The poem is also mentioned by characters in several novels, such as Nancy Mitford's Love in a Cold Climate (1949), Bel Kaufman's Up the Down Staircase (1965), David Benedictus's Floating Down to Camelot (1985), Diana Wynne Jones' Hexwood (1993), Libba Bray's A Great and Terrible Beauty (2003), and Jilly Cooper's Wicked! (2006).

Its various lines have been turned into book titles by authors such as Jessica Anderson (Tirra Lirra by the River, 1978), Sharyn McCrumb (Sick of Shadows, 1984), Robin Klein (All in the Blue Unclouded Weather, 1991), and Alan Bradley (I Am Half-Sick of Shadows, 2011). It also inspired the title of Elizabeth Bishop's poem "The Gentleman of Shalott" (1946).

=== Music ===
One of the first settings of the poem to music was by English composer Amy Horrocks who appeared at the 1898 Ballad Concert accompanying Ellen Bowick, for which Amy had composed a "graceful and picturesque" accompaniment of violin, cello and piano. Another early musical setting of the poem was probably a work for mezzo-soprano soloist, chorus and orchestra by the English composer Cyril Rootham, composed in 1909–1910. The only known performance of Rootham's op 33 The Lady of Shalott was given in the School Hall at Eton College on 18 September 1999, with the Broadheath Singers and the Windsor Sinfonia conducted by Robert Tucker. In 1957–1958, Arthur Bliss (once a pupil of Cyril Rootham) composed a 40-minute ballet suite titled The Lady of Shalott.

Olivier Messiaen's first composition, in 1917, was La dame de Shalott, a piece for solo piano based on the poem; however, it is unpublished. It has been recorded at least twice. Maurice Jacobson composed a cantata setting the poem for tenor, choir and orchestra in 1942. In 1946, Phyllis Tate's The Lady of Shalott was written for the 10th anniversary of the BBC Third Programme. Danish composer Bent Sørensen created a piece for viola solo, based on Waterhouse's painting The Lady of Shalott.

Canadian singer Loreena McKennitt adapted the poem to music, and featured it on her 1991 album The Visit, though some poem lines were removed. Dutch gothic metal band Autumn referred to "The Lady of Shalott" in their songs "Who Has Seen Her Wave Her Hand", "Mirrors Magic Sights", "When Lust Evokes the Curse", and "Floating Towards Distress" from their 2002 album When Lust Evokes the Curse, each song retelling parts of the story from the poem. The song titled "Shalott" on Emilie Autumn's 2006 album Opheliac tells the poem from her own perspective. The Band Perry's country music video "If I Die Young" makes clear visual references to "The Lady of Shalott": lead vocalist Kimberly Perry holds a book of poems by Tennyson as she lies in a boat, floating down a river like the Lady of Shalott (the boat in the Perry video is similar to some illustrations of the poem, such as the image by W. E. F. Britten).

Folk duo the Indigo Girls refer to the Lady of Shalott in "Left Me a Fool" from their 1987 album Strange Fire and Swedish pop band the Cardigans quotes it "Give Me Your Eyes", a bonus track on Super Extra Gravity. British musician and singer Richard Thompson took the title of his 1994 album Mirror Blue from the poem.

=== Television ===
The poem forms the backbone of voice-over for the episode "Tracie's Story" (2012) of Accused. In My Mother and Other Strangers (2016), Tennyson's poem plays an important role.

The poem has been also often quoted in whole or in part within other television films and series. Examples of that include the Upstairs, Downstairs episode "The Understudy" (1975), "Anne of Green Gables" (1985), The Buccaneers episode "Invasion" (1995), the Endeavour episode "Girl" (2013), and the Tales of the City episode "She Messy" (2019), as well as the BBC film An Englishman Abroad (1983). The poem is also referenced in Downton Abbey (season 4, episode 3), the movie Red Rooms (2023), and in season 3, episode 4 of The Way Home (2025).

== See also ==
- Weaving (mythology)
