= Mariana in the South (1897) =

Painting by John William Waterhouse

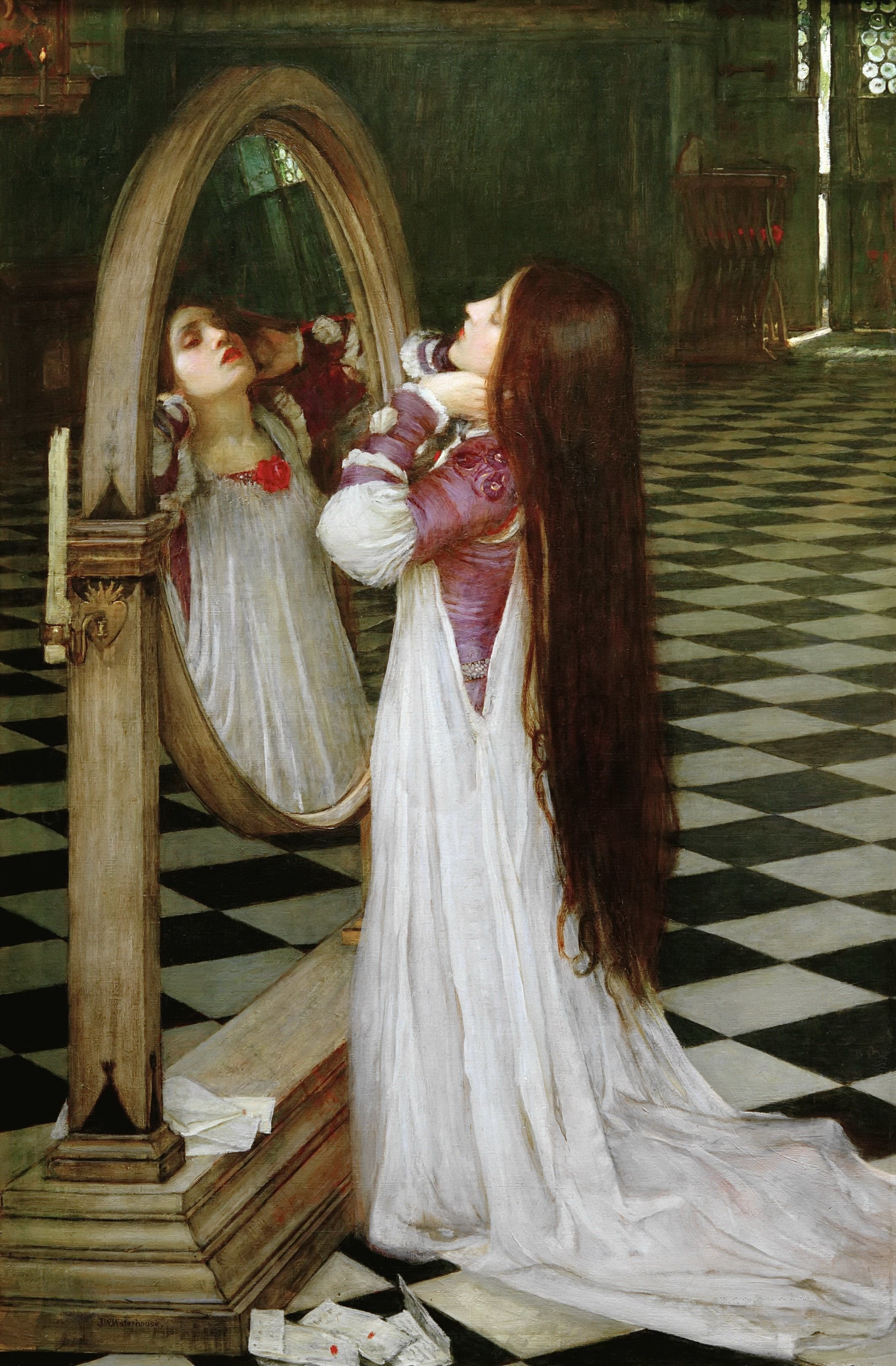
- Artist: John William Waterhouse
- Year: 1897
- Medium: Oil on canvas
- Dimensions: 114 cm × 74 cm (45 in × 29 in)

Mariana in the South is an 1897 oil painting on canvas by the British Pre-Raphaelite artist John William Waterhouse.

== Appraisal ==
Mariana in the South is a major painting by Waterhouse, and depicts scenes from the 1830 Tennyson poem "Mariana in the South". Mariana prays for the return of the lost love, the dictator Angelo, who brutally spurned her on the loss of her dowry. The picture illustrates the line "And in the liquid mirror glowed the clear perfection of her face" from Tennyson's poem.

== Provenance ==
The painting measures 114 by 74 centimetres (45 in × 29 in). It is now in a private collection.
