= Sir Galahad (poem) =

Poem by Alfred, Lord Tennyson

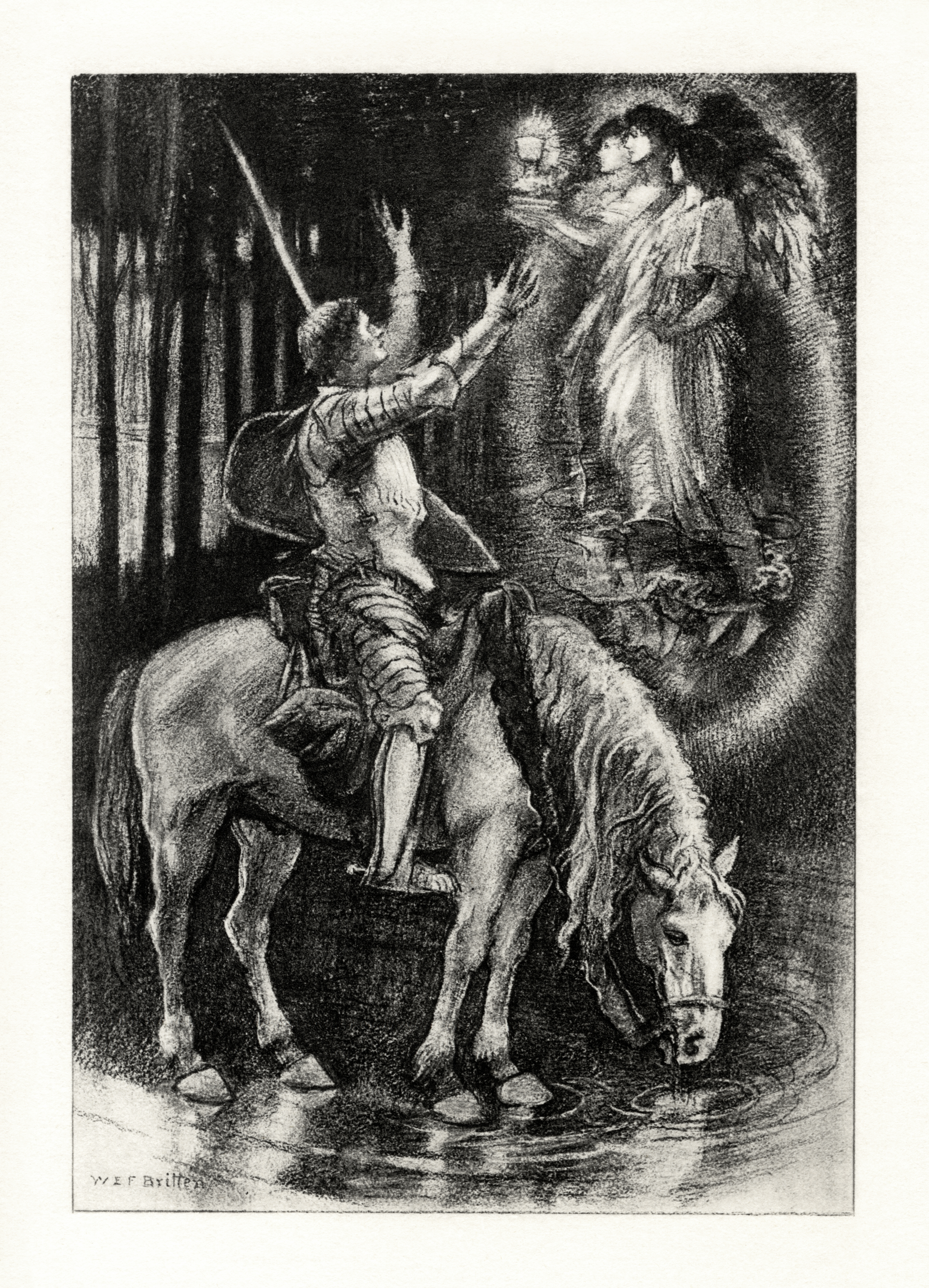
Illustration, c. 1901, by W. E. F. Britten.

Sir Galahad is a poem written by Alfred Tennyson, 1st Baron Tennyson, and published in his 1842 collection of poetry. It is one of his many poems that deal with the legend of King Arthur, and describes Galahad experiencing a vision of the Holy Grail. The subject of the poem was later included in The Holy Grail section of Tennyson's Idylls of the King, but the latter version depicts Galahad as a pious individual who is grimly determined to fulfill his destiny. Sir Galahad, in contrast, depicts him as proud, and has almost cheerful undertones.

== Background ==
In 1833, Tennyson's close friend Arthur Hallam died. The death greatly affected both Tennyson and his sister Emily, and he withdrew from society as he slowly dealt with the pain. By mid-summer 1834, they slowly began to participate together in social events once again. On one occasion, Tennyson, Emily, and his other sister Mary were invited to visit friends in Dorking, and then travel onwards to see the Hallam family. Tennyson, however, set out on his own and spent time alone at Leith Hill, Dorking. It was during this time that he began working on a version of Sir Galahad, along with an early version of The Blackbird and a version of The Sleeping Beauty.

The poem was completed in September 1834. It was published in the second volume of Tennyson's 1842 collection of poems, along with other poems discussing the Arthurian legend. These included Sir Launcelot and Queen Guinevere and Morte d'Arthur. The Galahad story was picked up again by Tennyson in the section The Holy Grail of Idylls of the King. The latter work was first published in 1868.

== Poem ==
The poem begins with a description of Galahad that, in terms of rhythm and rhyme, is almost cheerful even though the language is not:

My good blade carves the casques of men,
My tough lance thrusteth sure,
My strength is as the strength of ten
Because my heart is pure. (lines 1–4)

As the poem continues, Galahad is able to experience a vision that is preceded by a sound:

When down the stormy crescent goes,
A light before me swims,
Between dark stems the forest glows,
I hear a noise of hymns:
Then by some secret shrine I ride;
I hear a voice but none are there; (lines 25–30)

This vision includes three angels with the Holy Grail:

Three angels bear the holy Grail:
With folded feet, in stoles of white,
On sleeping wings they sail.
Ah, blessed vision! blood of God!
My spirit beats her mortal bars,
As down dark tides the glory slides,
And star-like mingles with the stars. (lines 42–48)

Galahad continues by comparing the vision to light clothed in drapery:

A maiden knight-to me is given
Such hope, I know not fear;
I yearn to breathe the airs of heaven
That often meet me here.
I muse on joy that will not cease,
Pure spaces clothed in living beams,
Pure lilies of eternal peace,
Whose odours haunt my dreams; (lines 61–68)

== Themes ==
In In Memoriam, Tennyson suggests that the supernatural has to be partly known and partly unknown. In order to incorporate this idea into his poetry, Tennyson relies on a series of different characters who serve as filters to visions of truth. These characters appear in many of Tennyson's poems, with the figure of Galahad being the one who is most capable of understanding the visions. In Galahad's case, his vision is of the Holy Grail, which contains images similar to those in "The Holy Grail" in Idylls of the King. In "The Holy Grail", Bors and Lancelot as well as Galahad receive visions. Of the three, Galahad is the one who best understands his abilities and his sins, and his strength allows him to complete his quest.

In terms of differences between "Sir Galahad" and "The Holy Grail", "Sir Galahad" depicts Galahad as prideful with regard to his abilities and to his purity, whereas "The Holy Grail" emphasizes that Galahad is both pious and grimly determined. Furthermore, the general tone of "Sir Galahad" is almost cheerful, whereas "The Holy Grail" is melancholic. "The Holy Grail" incorporates a passage in which King Arthur begs his knights not to quest because he knows that most of them will not return. In the event, the quest does indeed mark the end of the Round Table. In the end, only Galahad is capable of completing the Grail Quest, while many of the knights are killed.

As with "The Lady of Shalott", "Morte d'Arthur", and other poems, Tennyson incorporates technical aspects of "Sir Galahad" into Idylls of the King. The aspects that are drawn from "Sir Galahad" are the same as those taken from "Morte d'Arthur": the use of ritual. This addition allows Tennyson to create a long poem that relies on a variety of styles while containing artistic value. However, Idylls of the King varies in terms of meter and tone from "Sir Galahad", as the former is blank verse and the latter is a mixture of iambic tetrameter and iambic trimeter.

== Bibliography ==
- Elizabeth Epperly: The Fragrance of Sweet-Grass (Toronto: University of Toronto Press, 1992).
- Robert Martin: Tennyson: The Unquiet Heart (London: Faber and Faber, 1979).
- W. David Shaw: Tennyson's Style (Ithaca: Cornell University Press, 1976).
- Michael Thorn: Tennyson (New York: St. Martin's Press, 1992).
