= Idylls of the King =

Poetry cycle by Alfred, Lord Tennyson

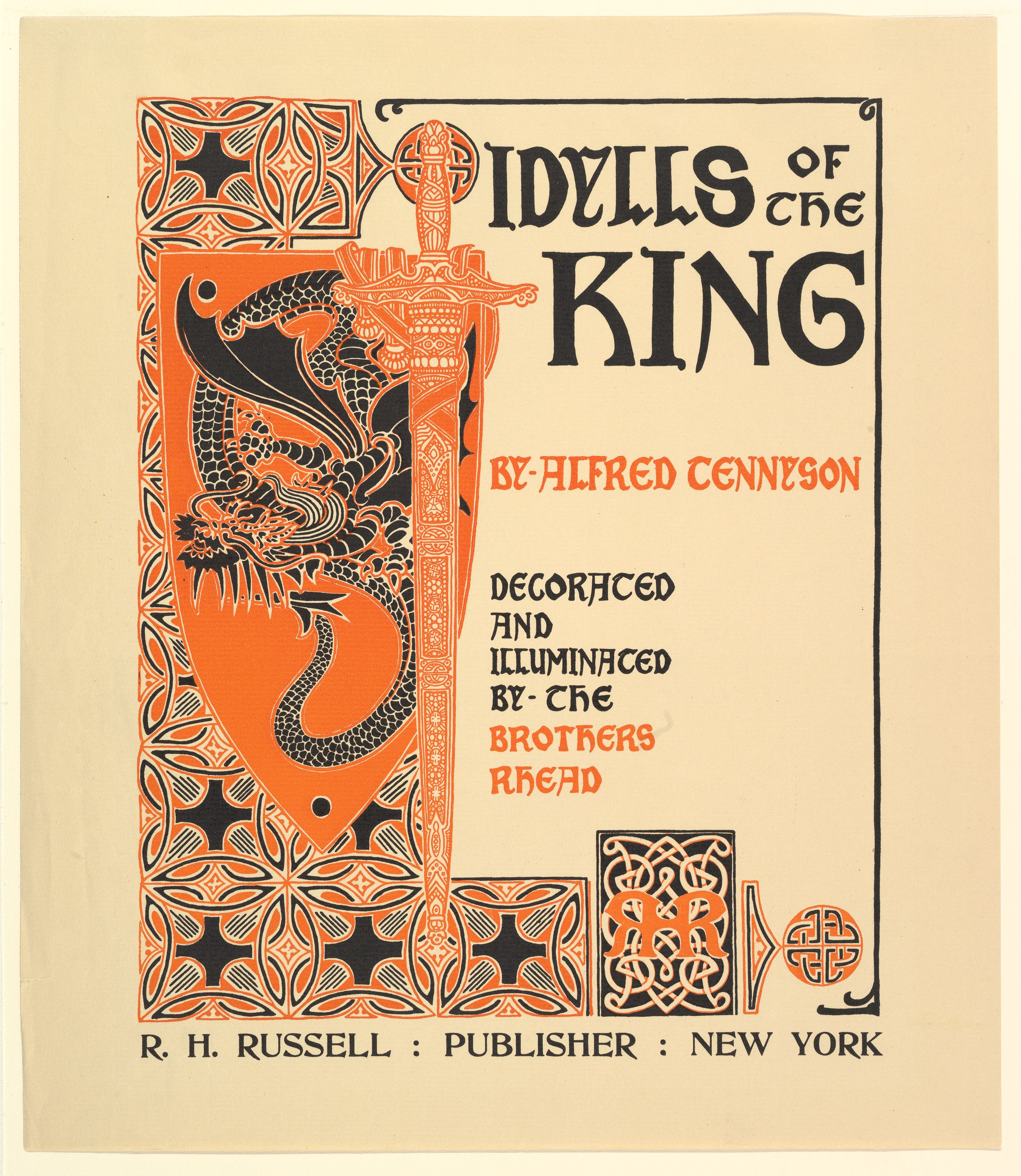
- Title page illuminated by Louis Rhead, 1898
- Author: Alfred, Lord Tennyson
- Language: English
- Genre: Blank verse, narrative poetry, Medievalism, Matter of Britain, Arthurian literature
- Publication date: 1859–1885
- Publication place: United Kingdom
- Dewey Decimal: 821.81
- LC Class: PR5558
- Text: Idylls of the King at Wikisource

Idylls of the King, published between 1859 and 1885, is a cycle of twelve narrative poems by the English poet Alfred, Lord Tennyson (1809–1892) which retells the legend of King Arthur and his Knights of the Round Table, their court at Camelot and the quest for the Holy Grail, Arthur's love for Queen Guinevere and her tragic betrayal of him with Lancelot, and the rise and fall of Arthur's kingdom.

Each idyll features one or more of Arthur's knights, including Lancelot, Galahad, Tristan, and Gawain, as well as other characters such as Elaine of Astolat, Queen Iseult of Cornwall, and Vivien. They recount Arthur's attempt to unite lawless Britain and create a perfect chivalric kingdom, from his coming to power with the help of Merlin, the Lady of the Lake, and the sword Excalibur to his mortal wounding at the hands of the traitor Mordred and his mystical passing to Avalon.

The twelve idylls follow the progression of the seasons through the year, with Arthur crowned in spring, Guinevere embracing Lancelot in summer, Camelot decaying in autumn, and Arthur fighting Mordred in midwinter. They do not form an epic in structure or tone, but express elegiac sadness, in the style of the Idylls of Theocritus, at the gradual corruption and disintegration of Arthur's realm.

Written in blank verse while Tennyson was Poet Laureate of the United Kingdom, and dedicated to the late Albert, Prince Consort, the Idylls contain many of his most resonant lines, including "Clothed in white samite, mystic, wonderful," and "The old order changeth, yielding place to new." Despite Arthur's faith that "the whole round earth is every way / Bound by gold chains about the feet of God," the Idylls typify the cultural pessimism felt by many in the Victorian era.

== Publishing chronology ==
The first set of Idylls, "Enid", "Vivien", "Elaine", and "Guinevere", was published in 1859. "Enid" was later divided into "The Marriage of Geraint" and "Geraint and Enid", and "Guinevere" was expanded. The Holy Grail and Other Poems appeared ten years later. "The Last Tournament" was published in Contemporary Review in 1871. "Gareth and Lynette" was published the following year. The final idyll, "Balin and Balan", was published in Tiresias and Other Poems in 1885. The Dedication was published in 1862, a year after the Prince Consort had died; the epilogue, "To the Queen", was published in 1873.

== The Idylls ==
=== The Coming of Arthur ===
The first of the Idylls covers the period following Arthur's coronation, his accession, and marriage. The besieged Leodogran, King of Cameliard, appeals to Arthur for help against the beasts and heathen hordes. Arthur vanquishes these and then the Barons who challenge his legitimacy. Afterwards, he requests the hand of Leodogran's daughter, Guinevere, whom he loves. Leodogran, grateful but also doubtful of Arthur's lineage, questions his chamberlain, Arthur's emissaries, and Arthur's half-sister Bellicent (the character known as Anna or Morgause in other versions), receiving a different account from each. He is persuaded at last by a dream of Arthur crowned in heaven.

Lancelot is sent to bring Guinevere, and she and Arthur wed in May. At the wedding feast, Arthur refuses to pay the customary tribute to the Lords from Rome, declaring, “The old order changeth, yielding place to new.” This phrase is repeated by Arthur throughout the work. Tennyson's use of the phrase in both the first and last Idyll, and throughout the work, is indicative of the change in Britain's, and Arthur's, fortunes. At this point, the phrase indicates the passing of Rome and the Heathens; In The Passing of Arthur, it indicates the downfall of Arthur's kingdom.

=== Gareth and Lynette ===
Tennyson based "Gareth and Lynette" on the fourth (Caxton edition: seventh) book of Malory's Le Morte d'Arthur. There are earlier versions of the Arthurian legends, those by Chrétien de Troyes being among the earliest. It is possible that Malory created the tale of Gareth himself, though he may have relied on an older work.

Of all the Idylls, “Gareth and Lynette” is sweetest and most innocent. Gareth, Bellicent and Lot's last son, dreams of knighthood but is frustrated by his mother. After a lengthy argument she clinches the matter, or so she thinks, by ordering him to serve as an anonymous scullion in Arthur's kitchens for a year and a day. To her disappointment, he agrees. Upon his arrival incognito at Camelot, Gareth is greeted by a disguised Merlin, who tells him the city is never built at all, and therefore built forever, and warns him that Arthur will bind him by vows no man can keep. Gareth is angered by his apparent tomfoolery, but is himself rebuked for going disguised to the truthful Arthur.

Arthur consents to the boy's petition for kitchen service. After Gareth has served nobly and well for a month, Bellicent repents and frees him from his vow. Gareth is secretly knighted by Arthur, who orders Lancelot to keep a discreet eye on him. Gareth's first quest comes in the form of the cantankerous Lynette, who begs Arthur for Lancelot's help in freeing her sister Lyonors. Rather than Lancelot, she is given Gareth, still seemingly a kitchen servant. Indignant, she flees, and abuses Gareth when he catches up.

On their journey, Gareth proves himself again and again, but Lynette continues to call him knave and scullion. Gareth remains courteous and gentle throughout. During the journey to the Castle Perilous, he overthrows the soi-disant knight of the Morning Star, knight of the Noonday Sun, knight of the Evening Star, and finally the most terrible knight of Death, who is revealed as a boy coerced into his role by his older brothers. Tennyson concludes: “And he [Malory] that told the tale in older times / Says that Sir Gareth wedded Lyonors, / But he, that told it later [Tennyson], says Lynette.”

=== Enid ===
"Enid" was initially written as a single poem but was later divided into two parts: "The Marriage of Geraint" and "Geraint and Enid". It is based on one of the Welsh Romances, Geraint and Enid, of the Mabinogion.

==== The Marriage of Geraint ====
Geraint, tributary prince of Devon and one of Arthur's bravest knights, is married to Enid, the only daughter of Yniol. He loves his wife deeply and she responds with equal affection; her only wish is to please him. At this time, the first rumours about Lancelot and Guinevere begin to spread throughout the court, but as yet there is no proof that any romance really exists. Geraint believes the stories and begins to fear that Enid will follow the bad example of her friend, the queen. His worries begin to plague him and he finally asks Arthur's permission to return to Devon.

After they arrive home, Geraint is very affectionate and attentive to his wife. He totally neglects his duties as a ruler and a knight, for he is obsessed with the idea that Enid has left a lover behind at the palace. Made suspicious by his jealousy, he stays at Enid's side at all times. Before long, Geraint's reputation begins to suffer. His people secretly scoff at him and jeer that his manliness is gone. Enid also is upset by his new and disgraceful way of life, but she is afraid to criticise him since she does not want to cause him any pain.

One morning as they lie in bed, she muses out loud about her sad dilemma and berates herself as a bad wife for remaining silent. Geraint awakens and overhears her last few words. He jumps to the conclusion that she is confessing her infidelity and is infuriated. He angrily shouts that he is still a warrior, despite all rumours, and that he will at once go on a quest to prove his prowess. She alone is to accompany him, taking no baggage and wearing her oldest and most shabby dress.

==== Geraint and Enid ====
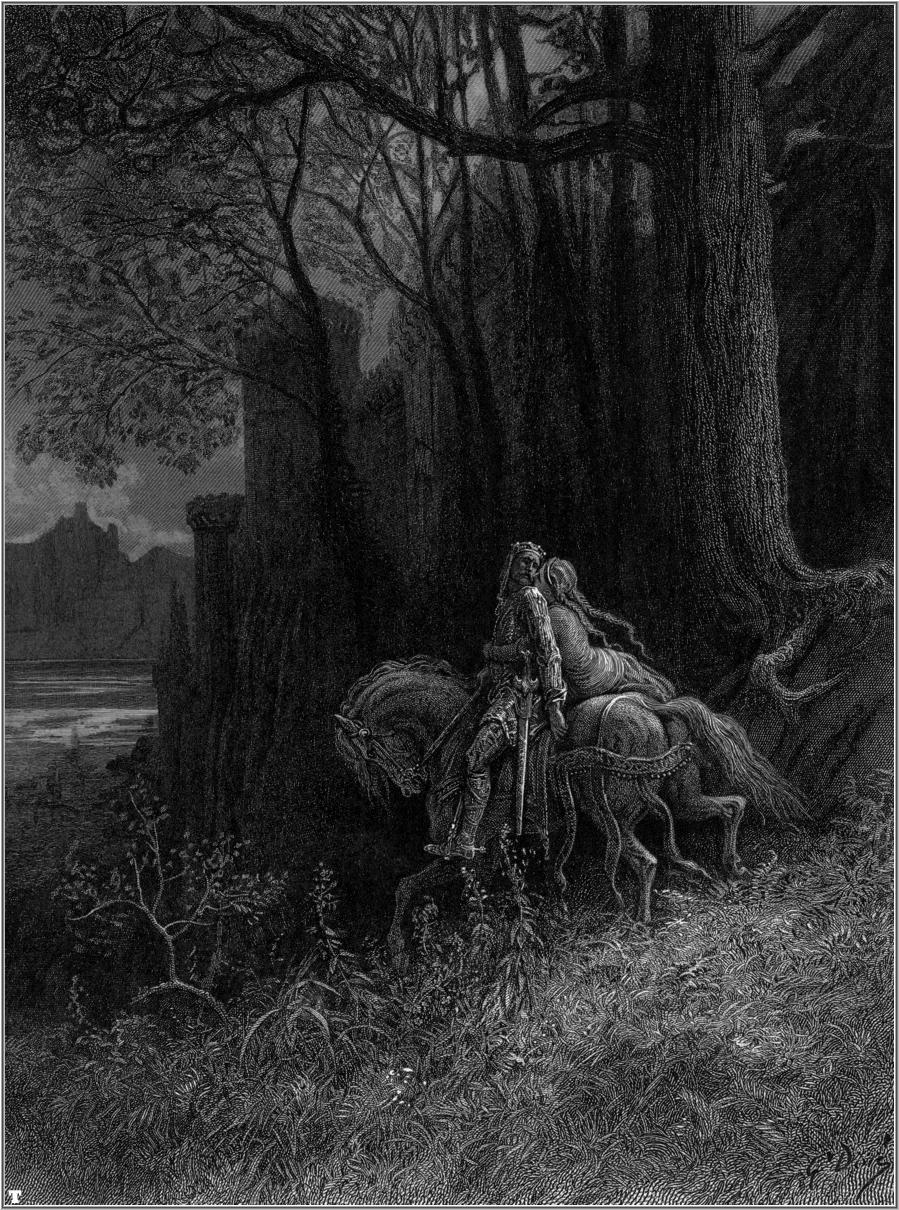
"Geraint and Enid Ride Away", illustration by Gustave Doré, 1868

Geraint and Enid set out on their journey that very morning. Geraint orders Enid to ride in front of him and not to speak, whatever the provocation. Perhaps, Tennyson hints, this command is because he still loves her and is afraid that in some outburst of his brooding jealousy he will harm her. The two ride on slowly into the bandit-infested wilderness adjoining Devon. Neither speaks, and both look pale and unhappy.

After a while, Enid notices three knights and overhears them planning to attack Geraint. He is riding so listlessly that he inspires no fear in them. She does not wish to disobey his order to her, but is afraid that he might be harmed. Finally, she rides back and warns him. Rather than show any gratitude, Geraint criticises Enid for her disobedience and needles her about his suspicion that she really wants him to be defeated. Geraint engages the knights and is victorious. He piles the armour of the dead knights on their horses and makes Enid lead them as she rides.

The same episode is repeated again with three other knights, and once more Geraint chastises Enid for her disobedience. He is triumphant in each fight. Now Enid is forced to lead six captured horses. Geraint has some sympathy for her difficulty handling them, but does not offer to help.

In the afternoon, Geraint and Enid dine with some farm workers and are then guided to an inn for the night. After arranging for accommodations, Geraint continues to be sullen and nasty. Later that evening, they are visited at the inn by the local ruler, Earl Limours, who, by chance, happens to have once been a suitor of Enid's. Limours is a crude drunkard, and Geraint callously allows him to make all sorts of coarse jokes, much to the distress and embarrassment of Enid. Before leaving for the night, Limours informs Enid that he still loves her and plans the next morning to rescue her from her cruel husband.

When day breaks, Enid warns Geraint of the plot. He, of course, suspects her of having encouraged the earl and is angry. They leave the inn immediately but are pursued by Limours and his followers. In a running fight, Geraint is able to drive them off.

Soon the unhappy couple enters the lawless territory of Earl Doorm the Bull. Suddenly Geraint collapses from his wounds. Enid is powerless to aid him and she sits by his side, weeping while he lies unconscious. After a while, Doorm and his soldiers ride past, returning from a raid, and the outlaw earl's curiosity is aroused by the lovely maiden and he questions her. Doorm insists that the wounded knight is dead, but Enid refuses to believe him. The outlaw chieftain has his soldiers bring Geraint's body and Enid to his stronghold.

At Doorm’s hall, a crude banquet unfolds while Enid sits apart, refusing food and drink as she keeps vigil over Geraint’s seemingly lifeless body, convinced he still lives. Doorm attempts to coerce her into becoming his mistress, but she steadfastly rejects him. Geraint, who has revived and overheard everything, pretends to remain dead to test her loyalty; when Doorm strikes her, he springs up and kills him. The hall erupts in chaos, and Geraint, remorseful for having doubted and mistreated Enid, escapes with her before Doorm’s men can retaliate.

As they gallop off together on one horse, they meet Edyrn, son of Nudd. He informs them that he is an advance scout for an army led by Arthur to rid this province of thieves and outlaws. He offers to guide them to the king's camp where Geraint reports to Arthur. After Geraint is shamed by the praise Arthur gives him, he and Enid are reconciled in their tent. When Geraint is well again, they all return to Caerleon. Later on, the happy couple returns to Devon. Geraint's chivalrous and commendable behaviour as ruler and knight ends all rumours about him.

=== Balin and Balan ===
"Balin and Balan" is based on the tale of Sir Balin in Book II of Le Morte d'Arthur. Malory's source was the Old French Post-Vulgate Cycle, specifically the text known as the Suite du Merlin.

The brothers Sir Balin "the Savage" and Balan return to Arthur's hall after three years of exile, and are welcomed warmly. When Arthur's envoys return, they report the death of one of Arthur's knights from a demon in the woods. Balan offers to hunt the demon, and before he departs warns Balin against his terrible rages, which were the cause of their exile. Balin tries to learn gentleness from Lancelot, but despairs and concludes that Lancelot's perfect courtesy is beyond his reach. Instead, he takes the Queen's crown for his shield, and several times it reminds him to restrain his temper.

Then, one summer morning, Balin beholds an ambiguous exchange between Lancelot and the Queen that fills him with confusion. He leaves Camelot and eventually arrives at the castle of Pellam and Garlon. When Garlon casts aspersions on the Queen, Balin kills him and flees. Ashamed of his temper, he hangs his crowned shield in a tree, where Vivien and her squire discover it, and then Balin himself. She spins lies to Balin that confirm his suspicions about Guinevere. He shrieks, tears down his shield, and tramples it. In that same wood, Balan hears the cry and believes he has found his demon. The brothers clash and only too late recognise each other. Dying, Balan assures Balin that their Queen is pure and good.

=== Merlin and Vivien ===
Having boasted to King Mark that she will return with the hearts of Arthur's knights in her hand, Vivien begs and receives shelter in Guinevere's retinue. While in Camelot, she sows rumours of the Queen's affair. She fails to seduce the King, for which she is ridiculed, and turns her attentions to Merlin. She follows him when he wanders out of Arthur's court, troubled by visions of impending doom. She intends to coax out of Merlin a spell that will trap him forever, believing his defeat would be her glory. She protests her love to Merlin, declaring he cannot love her if he doubts her. When he mentions Arthur's knights' gossip about her, she slanders every one of them. Merlin meets every accusation but one: that of Lancelot's illicit love, which he admits is true. Worn down, he allows himself to be seduced, and tells Vivien how to work the charm. She immediately uses it on him, and so he is imprisoned forever, as if dead to anyone but her, in a hollow, nearby oak tree.

=== Lancelot and Elaine ===
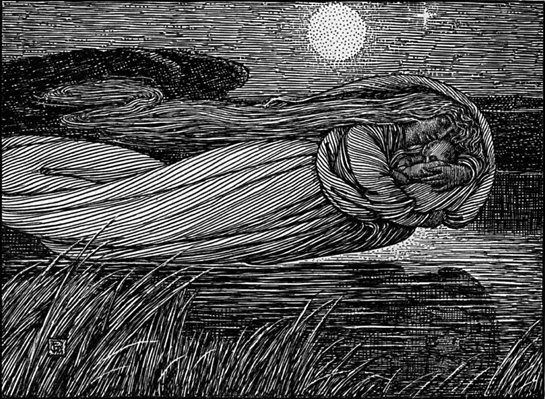
The Lady of the Lake steals Lancelot from his mother, illustration by George Wooliscroft Rhead Jr., 1898

"Lancelot and Elaine" is based upon the story of Elaine of Astolat, found in Le Morte d'Arthur, the Lancelot-Grail Cycle, and the Post-Vulgate Cycle. Tennyson had previously treated a similar subject in "The Lady of Shalott", published in 1833 and revised in 1842; however, that poem was based on the thirteenth-century Italian novellina La Damigella di Scalot, and thus has little in common with Malory's version.

Long ago, Arthur happened upon the skeletons of two warring brothers, one wearing a crown of nine diamonds. Arthur retrieved the crown and removed the diamonds. At eight annual tournaments, he awarded a diamond to the tournament winner. The winner has always been Lancelot, who plans to win once more and give all nine diamonds to his secret love Queen Guinevere. Guinevere chooses to stay back from the ninth tournament, and Lancelot then tells Arthur he too will not attend.

Once they are alone, she berates Lancelot for giving grounds for slander from court and reminds Lancelot that she cannot love her too-perfect king, Arthur. Lancelot then agrees to go to the tournament, but in disguise. He borrows armour, arms and colours from a remote noble, the Lord of Astolat, and as a finishing touch, agrees to wear Astolat's daughter Elaine's token favour. Lancelot's flattering chivalry wins over the impressionable young Elaine's heart. Here the Idyll repeats Malory's account of the tournament and its aftermath.

Elaine has fallen in love with Lancelot. When he tells her that their love can never be, she wishes for death, becomes weak, and dies. As per her request, her father and brothers put her on a barge with a note to Lancelot and Guinevere. Lancelot has returned to Camelot to present the nine diamonds to Guinevere. In jealous fury, the Queen hurls the diamonds out the window into the river as Elaine's funeral barge passes below. This fulfills a dream Elaine spoke of in which she held the ninth diamond, but it was too slippery to hold and fell into a body of water. Elaine's body is brought into the hall and her letter read, at which the lords and ladies weep. Guinevere privately asks Lancelot's forgiveness. The knight muses that Elaine loved him more than the Queen, wonders if all the Queen's love has rotted to jealousy, and wishes he was never born.

=== The Holy Grail ===
This Idyll is told in flashback by Sir Percivale, who had become a monk and died one summer before the account, to his fellow monk Ambrosius. His pious sister had beheld the Grail and named Galahad her "knight of heaven", declaring that he, too, would behold it. One summer night in Arthur's absence, Galahad sits in the Siege Perilous. The hall is shaken with thunder, and a vision of the covered Grail passes the knights. Percivale swears that he will quest for it a year and a day, a vow echoed by all the knights. When Arthur returns, he hears the news with horror. Galahad, he says, will see the Grail, and perhaps Percivale and Lancelot also, but the other knights are better suited to physical service than spiritual.

The Round Table disperses, and Percivale travels through a surreal, allegorical landscape until he meets Galahad in a hermitage. They continue together until Percivale can no longer follow, and he watches Galahad depart to a heavenly city in a boat like a silver star. Percival sees the grail, far away, not as close or real an image as Galahad saw, above Galahad's head. After the period of questing, only a remnant of the Round Table returns to Camelot, and some tell stories of their quests. Gawain decided to give up and spent pleasant times relaxing with women, until they were all blown over by a great wind, and he figured it was time to go home. Lancelot found a great, winding staircase, and climbed it until he found a room which was hot as fire and very surreal, and saw a veiled version of the grail wrapped in samite, a heavy silk popular in the Middle Ages, which is mentioned several times throughout the Idylls. "The Holy Grail" is symbolic of the Round Table being broken apart, a key reason for the doom of Camelot.

=== Pelleas and Ettare ===
Tennyson's source for "Pelleas and Ettare" was again Malory, who had himself adapted the story from the Post-Vulgate Cycle.

In an ironic echo of "Gareth and Lynette", the young, idealistic Pelleas meets and falls in love with the lady Ettare. She thinks him a fool, but treats him well at first because she wishes to hear herself proclaimed the "Queen of Beauty" at the tournament. For Pelleas' sake, Arthur declares it a "Tournament of Youth", barring his veteran warriors. Pelleas wins the title and circlet for Ettare, who immediately ends her kindness to him. He follows her to her castle, where for a sight of her he docilely allows himself to be bound and maltreated by her knights, although he can and does overthrow them all. Gawain observes this one day with outrage, offers to court Ettare for Pelleas, and for this purpose borrows his arms and shield. When admitted to the castle, he announces that he has killed Pelleas.

Three nights later, Pelleas enters the castle in search of Gawain. He passes a pavilion of Ettare's knights, asleep, and then a pavilion of her maidens, and then comes to a pavilion where he finds Ettare in Gawain's arms. He leaves his sword across their throats to show that, if not for Chivalry, he could have killed them. When Ettare wakes, she curses Gawain. Her love turns to Pelleas, and she pines away. Disillusioned with Arthur's court, Pelleas leaves Camelot to become the Red Knight in the North.

=== The Last Tournament ===
Guinevere had once fostered an infant found in an eagle's nest, who had a ruby necklace wrapped around its neck. After the child died, Guinevere gave the jewels to Arthur to make a tournament prize. However, before the tournament, a mutilated peasant stumbles into the hall. He was tortured by the Red Knight in the North, who has set up a parody of the Round Table with lawless knights and harlots. Arthur delegates the judging of the Tournament to Lancelot and takes a company to purge the evil. "The Tournament of the Dead Innocence" becomes a farce, full of discourtesies, broken rules, and insults. Sir Tristram wins the rubies. Breaking tradition, he rudely declares to the ladies that the "Queen of Beauty" is not present. Arthur's fool, Dagonet, mocks Tristram. In the north, meanwhile, Arthur's knights, too full of rage and disgust to heed their King, trample the Red Knight, massacre his men and women, and set his tower ablaze.

Tristram gives the rubies to Queen Isolt, Mark's wife, who is furious that he has married Isolt of Brittany. They taunt each other, but at the last he puts the necklace about her neck and bends to kiss her. At that moment, Mark rises behind him and splits his skull.

=== Guinevere ===
Guinevere has fled to the convent at Almesbury. On the night that she and Lancelot had determined to part forever, Mordred, tipped off by Vivien, watched and listened with witnesses to their farewells. Guinevere rejects Lancelot's offer of sanctuary in his castle overseas, choosing instead to take anonymous shelter in the convent. She is befriended by a little novice. But when rumours of war between Arthur and Lancelot and Mordred's usurpation reach the convent, the novice's careless chatter pricks the Queen's conscience. She describes to Guinevere the glorious kingdom in her father's day, "before the coming of the sinful Queen."

When the King arrives, she hears his steps and falls on her face. He stands over her and grieves over her, himself, and his kingdom, reproaches her, and forgives her. She watches him leave and repents, hoping they will be reunited in heaven. She serves in the abbey, is later chosen Abbess, and dies three years later.

=== The Passing of Arthur ===
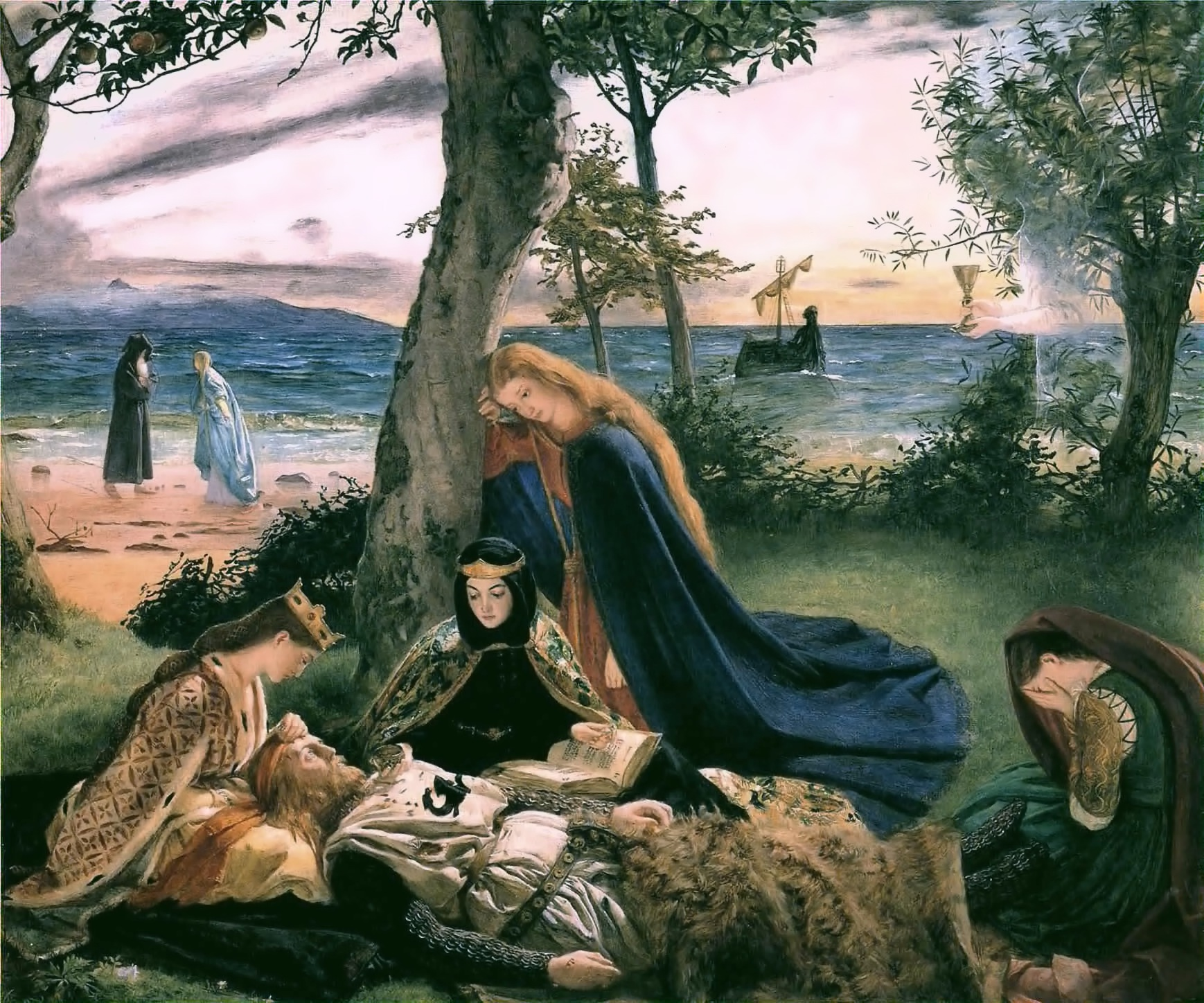
The Death of King Arthur by James Archer, 1860

This section of the Idylls is a much expanded and altered version of Thomas Malory's Morte d'Arthur.

In the disastrous last battle, Arthur kills Mordred, and, in turn, receives a mortal wound. The entire Round Table has been killed with the exception of Sir Bedivere, who carries the King to a church, where Arthur first received Excalibur from the Lady of the Lake. Arthur orders Bedivere to throw the sword into the lake to fulfill a prophecy written on the blade. Sir Bedivere resists twice, but on the third time obeys and is rewarded by the sight of an arm "clothed in white samite, mystic, wonderful" rising from the water to catch the sword. This was the Lady of the Lake. Sir Bedivere returns to Arthur in the church and tells him what he saw.

Mortally wounded, Arthur is carried by three queens on a black barge to the mystical valley of Avilion to heal, leaving Bedivere to witness the definitive end of the Round Table. Before vanishing, the King reflects on the necessity of the "old order" changing to make way for the new, emphasizing the power of prayer and the inevitability of transition. The scene concludes as the barge disappears into the horizon, while a rising sun signals both the birth of a new year and the faint hope of the King’s eventual return.

=== To the Queen ===
In the very brief final section, poet laureate Tennyson praises Queen Victoria and the recently deceased Albert, Prince Consort, whom Arthur was supposedly modelled after, and prays that she, like Arthur, is remembered as a great ruler long after her reign is over.

== Tennyson's sources ==
Tennyson based his retelling primarily on Sir Thomas Malory's Le Morte d'Arthur and the Mabinogion, but with many expansions, additions, and adaptations, such as the fate of Guinevere. In Malory, she retires to a convent, fleeing Mordred when he usurps Arthur's throne. She outlives Arthur, and has a final interview with Lancelot, whom she sends away as she is dedicated to her life as a nun. Lancelot emulates her, becoming a hermit and a priest. In the Idylls, however, Guinevere flees to a convent, grovels before and is forgiven by Arthur before his final battle, repents, and serves in the convent until she dies. Tennyson also amended the traditional spellings of several names to fit his chosen metre.

== Allegory for Victorian society ==
Tennyson sought to encapsulate the past and the present in the Idylls. Arthur in the story is often seen as an embodiment of Victorian ideals; he is said to be "ideal manhood closed in real man" and the "stainless gentleman". Arthur often has unrealistic expectations for the Knights of the Round Table and for Camelot itself, and despite his best efforts he is unable to uphold the Victorian ideal in his Camelot. Idylls also contains explicit references to Gothic interiors, Romantic appreciations of nature, and anxiety over gender role reversals—all pointing to the work as a specifically Victorian one.

In the Victorian age there was a renewed interest in the idea of courtly love, or the finding of spiritual fulfilment in the purest form of romantic love. This idea is embodied in the relationship between Guinevere and Arthur in the poem especially; the health of the state is blamed on Guinevere when she does not live up to the purity expected of her by Arthur as she does not sufficiently serve him spiritually. Tennyson's position as poet laureate during this time and the popularity of the Idylls served to further propagate this view of women in the Victorian age.

== Place of writing ==
Part of the work was written in the Hanbury Arms in Caerleon, where a plaque commemorates the event.

== Editions ==
- Tennyson, Alfred (1961). George Barker (ed.). Idylls of the King and a Selection of Poems. Signet Classic. ISBN 0-45-150123-3.
- Tennyson, Alfred (1983). J. M. Gray (ed.). Idylls of the King. Penguin Classics. ISBN 0-14-042253-6.
- Tennyson, Alfred (1896). Idylls of the King. Henry Altemus.
