= Mariana (Millais) =

Painting by John Everett Millais

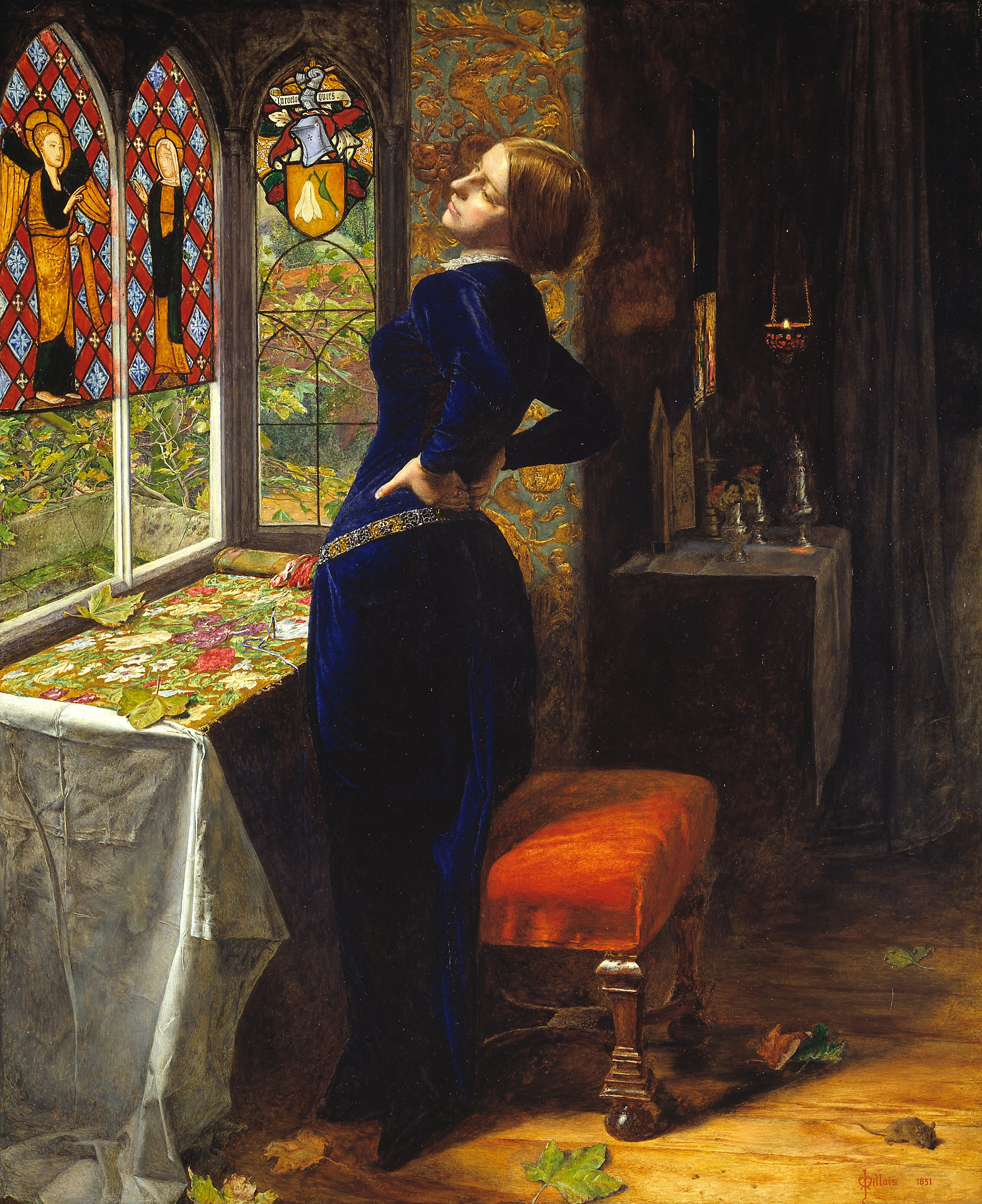
- Artist: John Everett Millais
- Year: 1851
- Medium: Oil on panel (mahogany)
- Dimensions: 59.7 cm × 49.5 cm (23.5 in × 19.5 in)
- Location: Tate Britain, London

Mariana, also known as Mariana in the Moated Grange, is an 1851 oil-on-panel painting by John Everett Millais. The image depicts the solitary Mariana from William Shakespeare's Measure for Measure, as retold in Tennyson's 1830 poem "Mariana". The painting is regarded as an example of Millais's "precision, attention to detail, and stellar ability as a colorist". It has been held by Tate Britain since 1999.

== Background ==
In Shakespeare's Measure for Measure, written between 1601 and 1606, Mariana is about to be married but is rejected by her fiancé Angelo when her dowry is lost in the shipwreck that also killed her brother. She retreats to a solitary existence in a moated house. Five years later, Angelo is tricked into consummating their betrothal: when Angelo demands the virginity of female protagonist Isabella in return for the safety of her brother, Claudio who is condemned to execution; Angelo believes the woman to be Isabella, when it is in fact his jilted fiancee Mariana. Tennyson retold the tale in his 1830 poem "Mariana", and returned to it in his 1832 poem "Mariana in the South".

Millais was a founding member of the Pre-Raphaelite Brotherhood, a group of English artists who came together in 1848 with the goal of renewing British painting. They found in the art of the early Italian Renaissance—before Raphael—a sincerity of purpose and clarity of form that they sought to emulate. The Pre-Raphaelites frequently used allegorical images to create a narrative to teach a moral virtue or virtues and sometimes used contemporary literature as inspiration for their paintings, which often include numerous details that allow the viewer to "read" the painting.

Millais used Tennyson's poetry to create a narrative for his painting of Mariana, and he wanted to allow the viewer familiar with Tennyson's poetry to read the entire poem through the painting. It was first exhibited at the Royal Academy in 1851 – the year after Tennyson was appointed as Poet Laureate – with a display caption that contained lines 9 to 12 from Tennyson's poem "Mariana" (1830):

She only said, 'My life is dreary,
He cometh not,' she said;
She said, 'I am aweary, aweary,'
I would that I were dead!'

Millais's painting may have been painted as a companion piece to William Holman Hunt's 1850 painting Claudio and Isabella, which also depicts a scene from Measure for Measure.

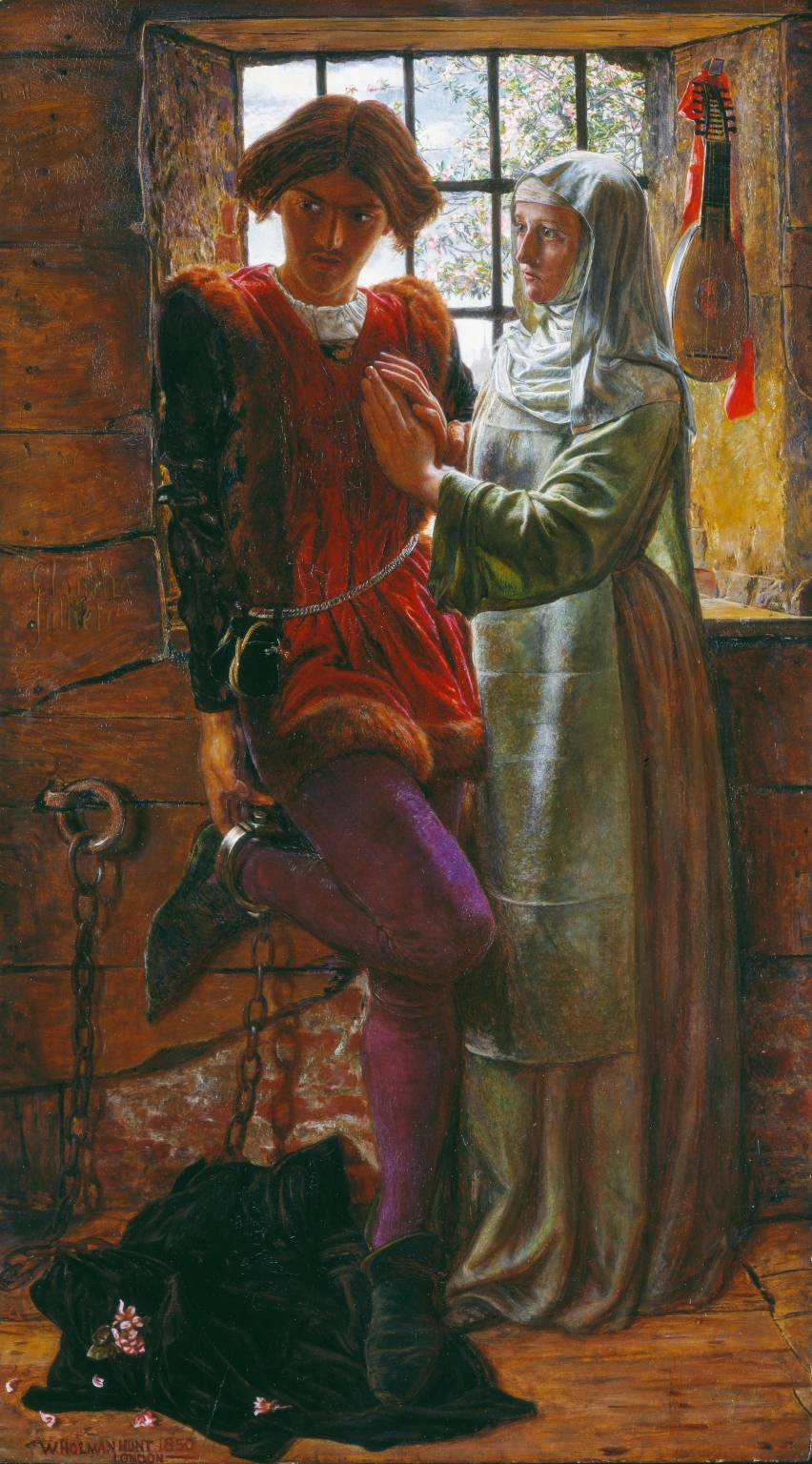
William Holman Hunt, Claudio and Isabella (1850), Tate Britain

== Description ==
The painting depicts a woman in a long blue dress, standing up from the embroidery laid out before her to stretch her back. Her upholstered stool and the table are set before a Gothic window with stained glass, through which can be seen a garden with leaves that are turning from green to autumnal brown. Some leaves have fallen on the embroidery and more onto the bare wooden floorboards beside a small mouse. In the background, a small triptych, a silver casket, and candles are set out as a devotional altar on a piece of furniture covered with white cloth beside the curtain of a bed.

The work is painted on a mahogany panel, primed with a white ground, and measures 49.5 cm × 59.7 cm (19.5 in × 23.5 in). It may have been painted wet-on-wet on a second ground, with graphite underdrawing. The paint is thinly applied in some areas to enhance the reflective effect of the white ground, but thickly applied in others. The woman's blue dress is painted with two blue pigments, Prussian blue and ultramarine.

The painting is packed with details that help the viewer to read the narrative of the work from Tennyson's poetry. The autumn leaves indicate a story about waiting and the passage of time. The woman's arched back makes it seem like she has been sitting too long and she must stand up to stretch before she sits back at her work, but her posture also emphasises her bust and hips. The roll of completed embroidery on the table gives the viewer a clue as to how long Mariana has been working on it.

The altar in the background may be a reference to Mariana's fervent prayers to the Virgin Mary in "Mariana in the South". The stained glass in the window shows an Annunciation scene, with the Angel Gabriel and the Virgin Mary, based on a window at the east end of the chapel of Merton College, Oxford, and also an invented coat of arms with a snowdrop and the Latin motto "In coelo quies" ("In Heaven there is rest"), possibly a reference to the feast of St Agnes' Eve and John Keats's poem The Eve of St Agnes.

Many of the details in the painting relate directly to Tennyson's poetry. For example, the little mouse in the bottom right corner is a detail directly from the poem: "the mouse behind the mouldering wainscots shriek'd or from the crevice peer'd about". An anecdote reports that the mouse was drawn from life – or rather death, as it was killed by Millais after it scurried across the floor and hid behind some furniture so he could immortalise it.

Together, Millais's painting and Tennyson's poem create an intriguing storyline for the reader to follow. However, Millais's painting departs from Tennyson's narrative in some respects. The Mariana depicted by Millais is placed in a scene filled with vibrant colours; she is not the forlorn woman described by Tennyson, unwilling to live an independent life, confined to a dilapidated retreat, with a "mouldering wainscots".

In turn, Millais's painting inspired Elizabeth Gaskell's 1853 novel, Ruth. Tennyson's Mariana and Gaskell's main character Ruth are both sensitive to the sounds around them and constantly look out of their windows in an image that represents their imprisonment within their homes. The image of Mariana used by Tennyson and the later works is equally of a weary woman.

== Reception ==
The painting was first exhibited in 1851, the year after Millais's painting Christ In The House Of His Parents had been heavily criticised by art critics and the public.

In 1851, Ruskin wrote in defence of the PRB that it "lays in our England the foundations of a school of art nobler than the world has seen for 300 years". He wrote on 9 May that " there is not a single study of drapery in the whole Academy, be it in large works or small, which for perfect truth, power, and finish, could be compared for an instant with … with the white draperies on the table in Mr. Millais' "Mariana" … And further: that as studies both of drapery and of every minor detail, there has been nothing in art so earnest or so complete as these pictures since the days of Albert Durer."

The painting was accepted in lieu of £4.2m of inheritance tax payable on the estate of Roger Makins, 1st Baron Sherfield, who died in 1996. It was allocated to the Tate Gallery in 1999, when it was described as "arguably the greatest Pre-Raphaelite painting"

The Makin Collection of Victorian paintings and drawings, which includes works by artists such as Millais, Holman Hunt, Rossetti, and Burne-Jones, was inherited by his son Christopher Makins and transferred to his residence in Washington, DC. The collection was begun by Henry Francis Makins (1841–1914), a friend of Millais, and enlarged by Roger, his grandson.

The Victoria & Albert Museum holds an 1850 study in pen and ink on paper.
