= The Two Voices =

Poem by Alfred, Lord Tennyson

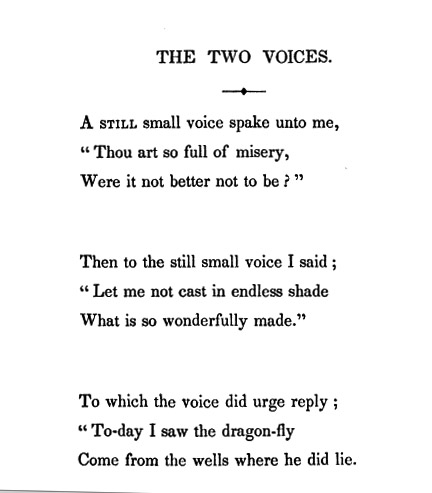
"The Two Voices" from an American edition of Poems, 1842

"The Two Voices" is a poem written by future Poet Laureate of the United Kingdom Alfred, Lord Tennyson between 1833 and 1834. It was included in his 1842 collection of Poems. Tennyson wrote the poem, titled "Thoughts of a Suicide" in manuscript, after the death of his friend Arthur Henry Hallam in 1833. The poem was autobiographical.

== Background ==
Tennyson explained, "When I wrote 'The Two Voices' I was so utterly miserable, a burden to myself and to my family, that I said, 'Is life worth anything?'" (Hill, 54). In the poem, one voice urges the other to suicide ("There is one remedy for all" repeated on lines 201 and 237); the poet's arguments against it range from vanity to desperation, yet the voice discredits all. The poem's ending delivers no conclusions, and has been widely criticized—the poet finds no internal affirmation, invoking "solace outside himself" (Tucker). "The Two Voices" was published following a ten-year span (1832-1842) in which Tennyson did not publish anything, coinciding with what some call "one of the deafening silences of Victorian literary history".

== Analysis ==
=== Poetic structure ===
The poem is written in Iambic tetrameter with a rhyme scheme consisting of tercets (three lines of matching end rhyme). It is 205 stanzas long (615 lines). It was praised for its depth and style.

The poem is believed to have been written in an experimental form of poetic dialogue: "Tennyson's chief purpose in writing the poem: the creation of a sustained poetic dialogue—the exploration of a road ultimately not taken in Tennyson's career."

The poem follows the poet's struggle to argue convincingly against the voice that suggests suicide, which twice in the poem declares that "there is one remedy for all":

Then comes the check, the change, the fall,
Pain rises up, old pleasures pall,
There is one remedy for all. (ll. 163-165)

"Cease to wail and brawl!
Why inch by inch to darkness crawl?
There is one remedy for all.” (ll. 199-201)

== Response ==
"The Two Voices" attracted the attention of the nineteenth-century philosopher and social scientist Herbert Spencer, who believed some of the theories between the poem and his own book, The Principles of Psychology, were interconnected.

Jerome Buckley asserted that the poem is "tinged with Satanic irony", and "the voice of negation, cynical and realistic, puncturing a desperate idealism, forced upon the reluctant ego an awareness of man’s fundamental insignificance" and that it "remains intense as the colloquy of denial with doubt in the dark night of the soul".

Basil Willey claimed: "Tennyson, in my view, should not be blamed…for failing to find a solution where no solution exists; nor should he be accused of wishful thinking when he asserts... that the Heart has its reasons of which Reason knows nothing."

William R. Brashear's "Tennyson's Third Voice: A Note" points out that the argument is between "Dionysian" (emotional human nature) and "Socratic" (intellectual) voices. The Dionysian ("the still small voice") is of conscious, subjective fact. It "does not call upon the poet to reason, only to see that "it were better not to be".

The Socratic voice, whose "optimistic arguments are all objective", "utilizes a full assortment of rationales ranging from scientific faith in progress to Platonic ideas of immortality. But...it is feeble and impotent against the subjective fact."

The third voice is "hopeful rather than optimistic" and "simply bolsters the poet against the overpowering vision of futility".

The poem has also received a considerable amount of criticism as one of Tennyson's less impressive poems. Published after a ten-year dry spell, being a more experimental poem for Tennyson, there are those who believe it does not exemplify his poetic genius as well as some of his other pieces. "The Two Voices" has been criticized as unnecessarily long and lacking any sort of literary resolution, that it "seems to be one of those works whose end cycles back to the beginning". The ambiguity between all the voices involved has been considered to be too much for even the experienced reader to interpret and the meaning is too difficult to decipher.
