= La Damigella di Scalot =

Thirteenth-century Italian romance novellina

La Damigella di Scalot is a thirteenth-century Italian romance novellina, i.e. a very short story, included in the collection Il Novellino: Le ciento novelle antiche (Novellino. The hundred ancient tales) as the 82nd tale. It tells the story of the unrequited love of the titular Lady of Scalot for Sir Lancelot and the subsequent death of the lady by lovesickness.

The character of the Lady of Scalot is based on the Arthurian legend of Elaine of Astolat. British Romantic poet Alfred Lord Tennyson wrote a poem on the same topic titled "The Lady of Shalott", a lyrical ballad which sets the story on an island in the river "flowing down to Camelot". It adds the element of a mysterious curse by fear of which she never leaves her fortress and passes the time by weaving a tapestry of "shadows" seen through her mirror.

== The original story from Il Novellino, translated in English ==
QUI CONTA COME LA DAMIGELLA DI SCALOT MORÌ, PER AMORE DI LANCIALOTTO DEL LAC.

Una figliuola d’un grande varvassore si amò Lancialotto del Lac, oltre misura; ma elli non le voleva donare suo amore, imperciò che elli l’avea donato alla reina Ginevra. Tanto amò costei Lancialotto, ch’ella ne venne alla morte e comandò che, quando sua anima fosse partita dal corpo, che fosse arredata una ricca navicella, coperta d’uno vermiglio sciamito, con un ricco letto ivi entro, con ricche e nobili coverture di seta, ornato di ricche pietre preziose: e fosse il suo corpo messo in questo letto, vestita di suoi più nobili vestimenti e con bella corona in capo, ricca di molto oro e di molte pietre preziose, e con ricca cintura e borsa. Ed in quella borsa avea una lettera, che era dello infrascritto tenore. Ma, in prima, diciamo di ciò, che va innanzi la lettera. La damigella morì di mal d’amore, e fu fatto di lei, ciò che disse. La navicella, sanza vela, e sanza remi e sanza neuno sopra sagliente, fu messa in mare, con la donna. Il mare la guidò a Camalot, e ristette alla riva. Il grido andò per la corte. I cavalieri e baroni dismontaro de’ palazzi, e lo nobile re Artù vi venne, e maravigliavasi forte, ch’era sanza niuna guida. Il Re intrò dentro: vide la damigella e l’arnese. Fe’ aprire la borsa: trovaro quella lettera. Fecela leggere, e dicea così: «A tutti i cavalieri della Tavola ritonda manda salute questa damigella di Scalot, sì come alla miglior gente del mondo. E se voi volete sapere perch’io a mia fine sono venuta, sì è per lo migliore cavaliere del mondo, e per lo più villano; cioè monsignore messer Lancialotto del Lac, che già nol seppi tanto pregare d’amore, ch’elli avesse di me mercede. E così, lassa, sono morta, per ben amare, come voi potete vedere!».

—Il Novellino. Le ciento novelle antike. LXXXII
Translation:

HERE IS NARRATED OF HOW THE LADY OF SHALOTT DIED, FOR LOVE OF LANCELOT OF THE LAKE

One of the daughters of a great vavasour fell in love with Lancelot of the Lake, beyond measure; but he refused to give her his love, as he had given it to Queen Guinevere. So intensely she loved Lancelot, that she came to her death, and she ordered that, when her soul should depart from her body, [that] a rich boat should be furnished, covered in vermilion samite, with a rich bed within, with rich and noble silk coverings, adorned with rich precious stones: and that her body should be placed upon this bed, dressed of her most noble vestments, and with a beautiful crown on her head, rich of much gold and many precious stones, and with rich belt and purse. And in that purse she kept a letter, of tones unfolded hereafter. Yet, first, we tell what happens before the letter. The lady died of lovesickness, and it was done of her as she had said. The boat, with no sail, and with no oars and no-one on, was set to sea, with the woman on. The sea drove her to Camelot, and it stopped on the shore. A cry reached the court. Knights and barons descended from their palaces, and the noble King Arthur went there, and was greatly surprised that it had no pilot. The King got on board: he saw the lady and her device. He had the purse opened: they found the letter. He had it read, and it said thus: “To all the knights of the Round Table sends health this lady of Shalott, as to the best people of the world. And if you want to know why I came to my end, that is because of the greatest knight in the world, and the most villainous; that is my lord Sir Lancelot of the Lake, whom I was unable to pray of his love such that he would have pity of me. And thus, weary, I died, for loving well, as you can see!”.
