= Mariana in the South =

Poem by Alfred Tennyson

- by Alfred Tennyson
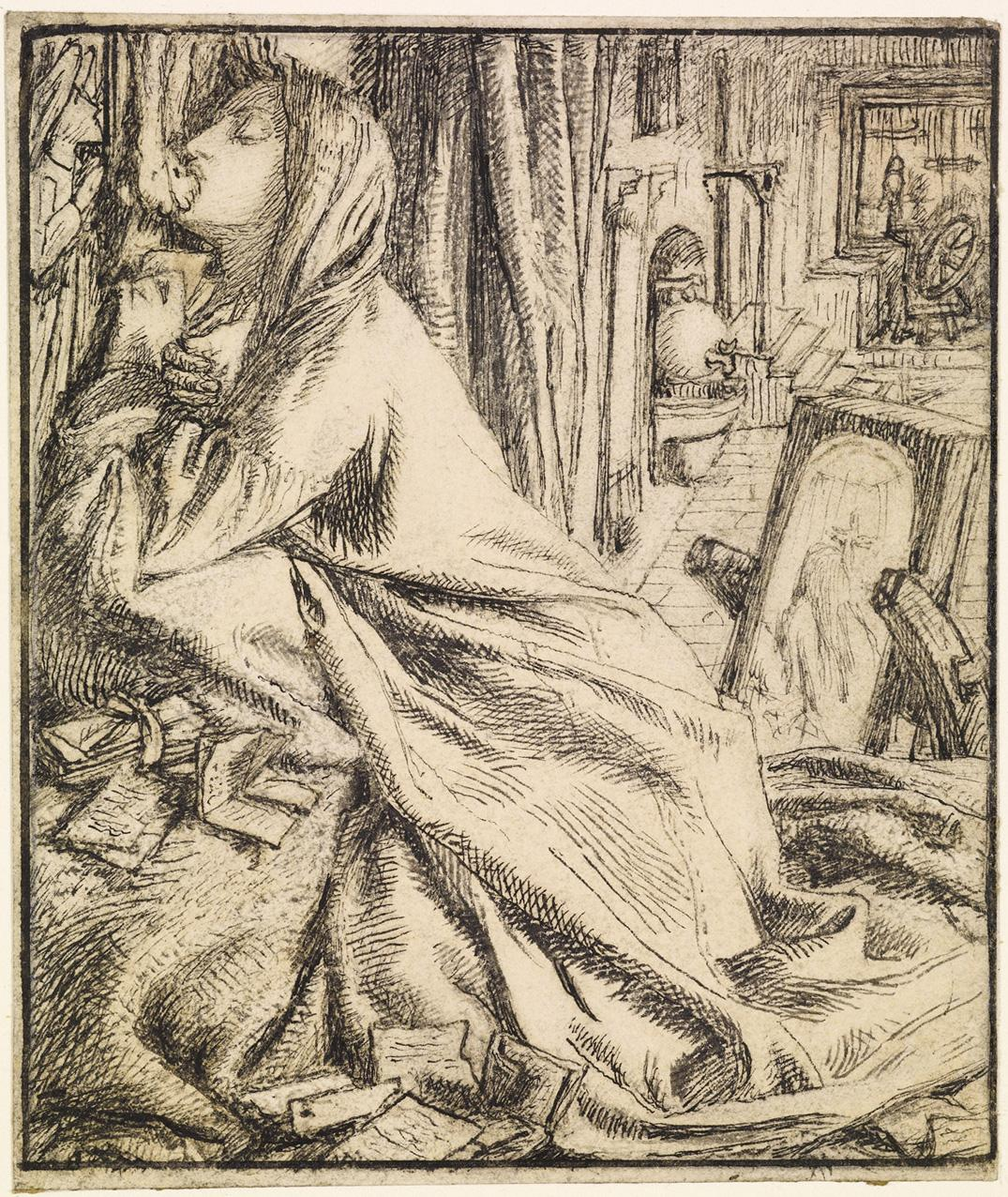
- Mariana in the South. Design by D. G. Rossetti for Moxon's edition of Tennyson (1857)
- Genre: Romanticism
- Meter: Iambic tetrameter
- Rhyme scheme: ABABCDDCEFEF
- Publication date: 1833; 1842
- Lines: 96

Full text
- Poems (Tennyson, 1843)/Volume 1/Mariana in the South at Wikisource

"Mariana in the South" is an early poem by Alfred Tennyson, first printed in 1833 and significantly revised in 1842.

== Textual history ==
This poem had been written as early as 1831, and Hallam Tennyson tells us that it "came to my father as he was travelling between Narbonne and Perpignan". The characteristic features of Southern France are vividly depicted. The poem was very greatly altered when re-published in 1842, that text being practically the final one, there being no important variants afterwards.

In the edition of 1833 the poem opened with the following stanza, which was afterwards excised and the stanza of the present text substituted:

Behind the barren hill upsprung
With pointed rocks against the light,
The crag sharpshadowed overhung
Each glaring creek and inlet bright.
Far, far, one light blue ridge was seen,
Looming like baseless fairyland;
Eastward a slip of burning sand,
Dark-rimmed with sea, and bare of green,
Down in the dry salt-marshes stood
That house dark latticed. Not a breath
Swayed the sick vineyard underneath,
Or moved the dusty southernwood.
"Madonna," with melodious moan
Sang Mariana, night and morn,
"Madonna! lo! I am all alone,
Love-forgotten and love-forlorn."

== See also ==
- Mariana (poem)
- Measure for Measure
- Works related to Mariana in the South at Wikisource

== Bibliography ==
- Collins, John Churton, ed. (1900). The Early Poems of Alfred, Lord Tennyson. London: Methuen & Co. pp. 50–53.
- McLuhan, H. M., ed. "Mariana in the South". RPO: Representative Poetry Online. University of Toronto Libraries. Retrieved 12 May 2022.
- Tennyson, Hallam (1897). Alfred Lord Tennyson: A Memoir by his Son. Vol. 1. London: Macmillan and Co., Limited. pp. 117, 500–504.
