= The Palace of Art =

Poem by Alfred, Lord Tennyson

"The Palace of Art" is an 1832 (revised 1842) poem by Alfred Tennyson. In the poem a man constructs a palace of art for his soul with any amount of art. The art of the palace and its gardens deals with sacred, secular and irreligious themes, the moral value appears irrelevant and only the artistic value matters. The builder converses figuratively with his soul, referred to as she from the Latin anima. The builder's soul at first likes the palace but later tires of it and asks for a cottage where she can purge her guilt.
