= Oenone (disambiguation) =

Oenone (Œnone) is a female character in Greek mythology.

Oenone may also refer to:

- "Oenone" (poem), by Alfred Lord Tennyson
- Oenone, ancient name of Aegina, and island of Greece
- 215 Oenone, an asteroid
- Oenone Wood (born 1980), retired Australian racing cyclist
- Oenone Zero, fictional character in the Mortal Engines Quartet by Philip Reeve
- Œnone, character in the play Phèdre
- Edith Somerville, middle name Œnone (1858–1949), Irish writer
- Junonia oenone or blue pansy, a butterfly native to Africa
