= Photogravure =

Photographic printing technique

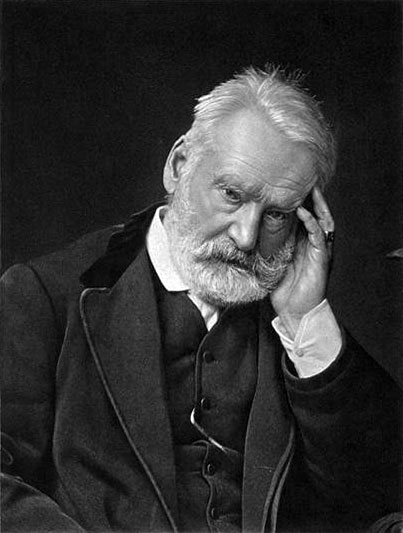
Photogravure of Victor Hugo, 1883 by Walery

Photogravure (in French héliogravure) is a process for printing photographs, also sometimes used for reproductive intaglio printmaking. It is a photo-mechanical process whereby a copper plate is grained (adding a pattern to the plate) and then coated with a light-sensitive gelatin tissue which had been exposed to a film positive, and then etched, resulting in a high quality intaglio plate that can reproduce detailed continuous tones of a photograph.

The process was important in 19th-century photography, but by the 20th century was only used by some fine art photographers. By the mid-century it was almost extinct, but has seen a limited revival.

== History ==
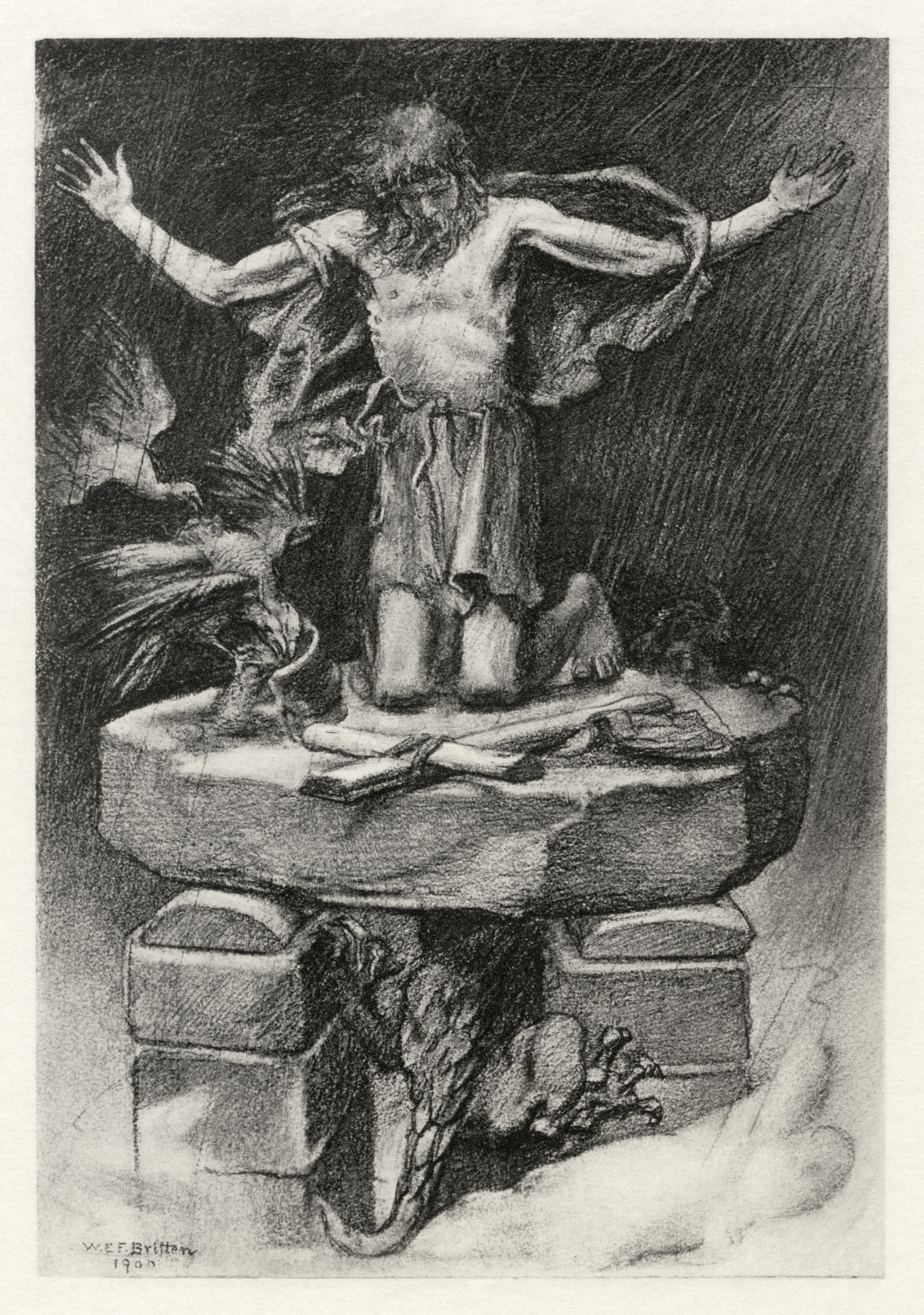
A 1901 photogravure illustration by W. E. F. Britten for Alfred, Lord Tennyson's poem St. Simeon Stylites.

=== History of process ===
The earliest forms of photogravure were developed by two original pioneers of photography itself, first Nicéphore Niépce in France in the 1820s, and later Henry Fox Talbot in England. Niépce was seeking a means to create photographic images on plates that could then be etched and used to make prints on paper with a traditional printing press. He used prints (engravings etc.), waxing the paper to make it translucent, then laying this on a copper plate coated with light-sensitive bitumen. Niépce's early images were among the first photographs, pre-dating daguerreotypes and the later wet collodion photographic process. But the process was little used, not least because the original engraving was all but destroyed. But once a "transparent photographic positive" became possible, interest revived.

Talbot, inventor of the calotype paper negative process, wanted to make paper prints that would not fade. He worked on his photomechanical process in the 1850s and patented it in 1852 ('photographic engraving') and 1858 ('photoglyphic engraving').

Photogravure in its mature form was developed in 1878 by Czech painter Karel Klíč, who built on Talbot's research.^{:4} This process, the one still in use today, is called the Talbot-Klič process.

=== History of use ===
Because of its high quality and richness, photogravure was used for both original fine art prints in the form of photographs manipulated by various means on the negative and for photo-reproduction of works from other media such as paintings. From the 1880s, the Talbot-Klič process was used commercially for very high quality reproductions of old master prints, excelling in capturing variations in tone.

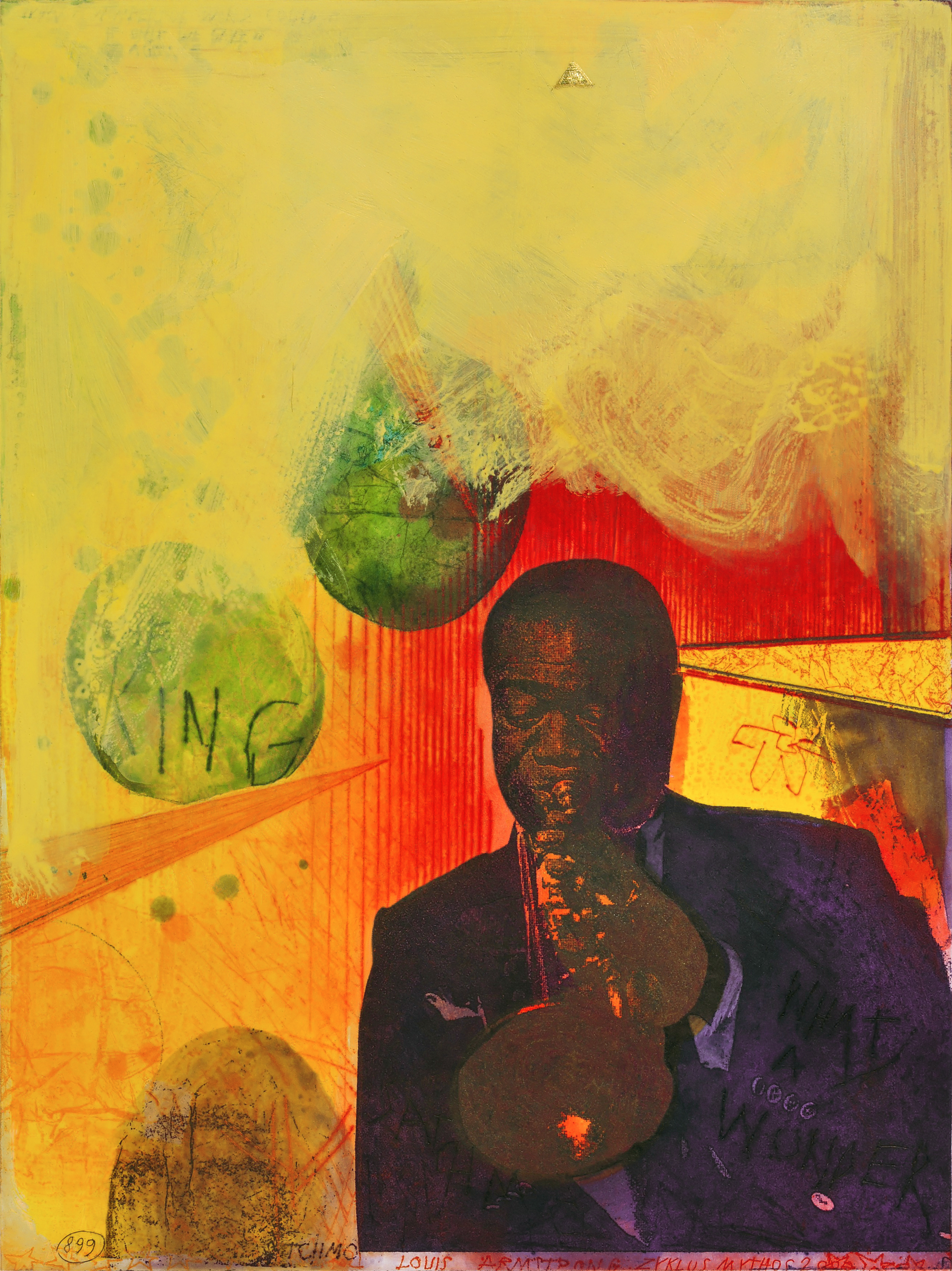
Adi Holzer, Werksverzeichnis 899 Satchmo (Louis Armstrong), photogravure and etching, 2002.

Photogravure practitioners, such as Peter Henry Emerson, brought the art to a high standard in the late 19th century. This continued with the work of Alfred Stieglitz in the early 20th century, especially in relation to his publication Camera Work. This publication also featured the photogravures of Alvin Langdon Coburn who was a fine gravure printer and envisioned his photographic work as gravures rather than other photo-based processes.

The speed and convenience of silver-gelatin photography eventually displaced photogravure, which fell into disuse after large photogravure projects such as Edward S. Curtis's The North American Indian, published between 1907 and 1930 with more than two thousand plates. One of the last major portfolios of fine art photogravures was Paul Strand's Photographs of Mexico of 1940, reissued as The Mexican Portfolio in 1967 by Da Capo Press for Aperture, in an edition of 1,000 with twenty hand-pulled gravures.

The process was revived from the 1970s by the American printer Jon Goodman, who learned it in Europe and in 1978 established a photogravure workshop for Aperture at Millerton, New York, where he printed portfolios after Paul Strand and Edward Steichen. Photogravure is now actively practiced in several dozen workshops around the world. Contemporary artists working in the medium include Sama Alshaibi. Photogravure may be used in combination with other print processes.

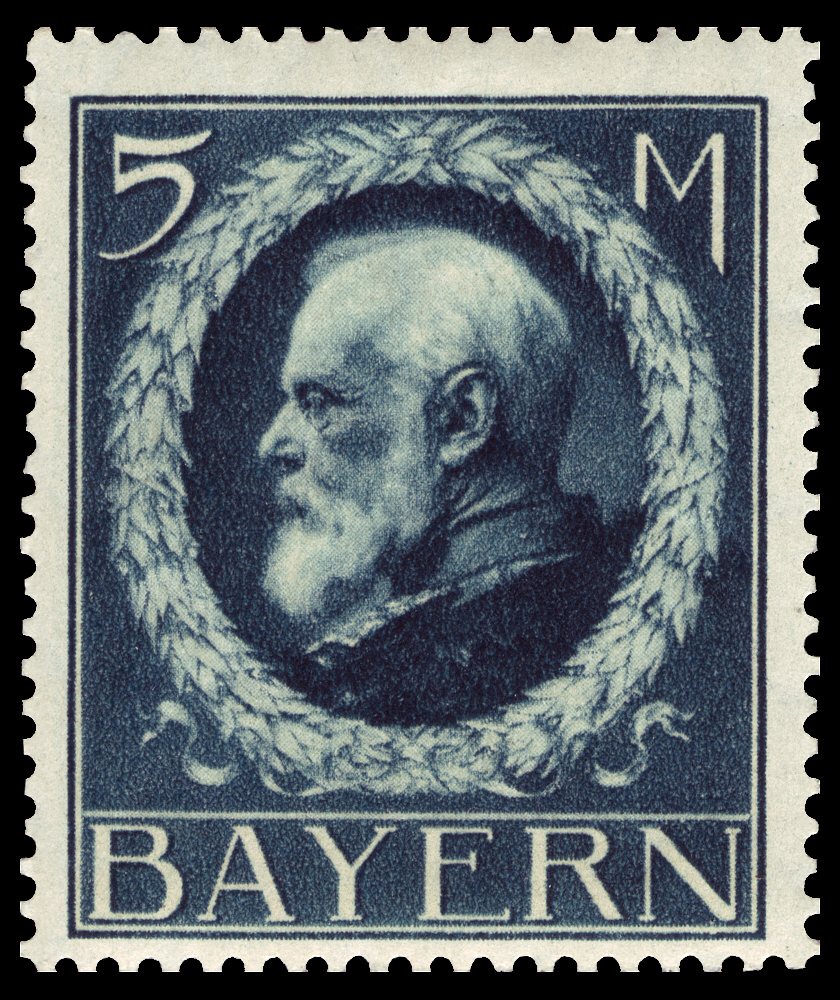
1914 stamp of Ludwig III of Bavaria.

==== Stamps ====
Photogravure has often been used to print stamps. For example, between 1934 and 1936, stamps of King George V were produced by the British postal service using photogravure, as were the majority of British stamps from then until 1996. In the United States, the Bureau of Engraving and Printing began printing stamps in gravure from its own press in 1971.

== Qualities ==
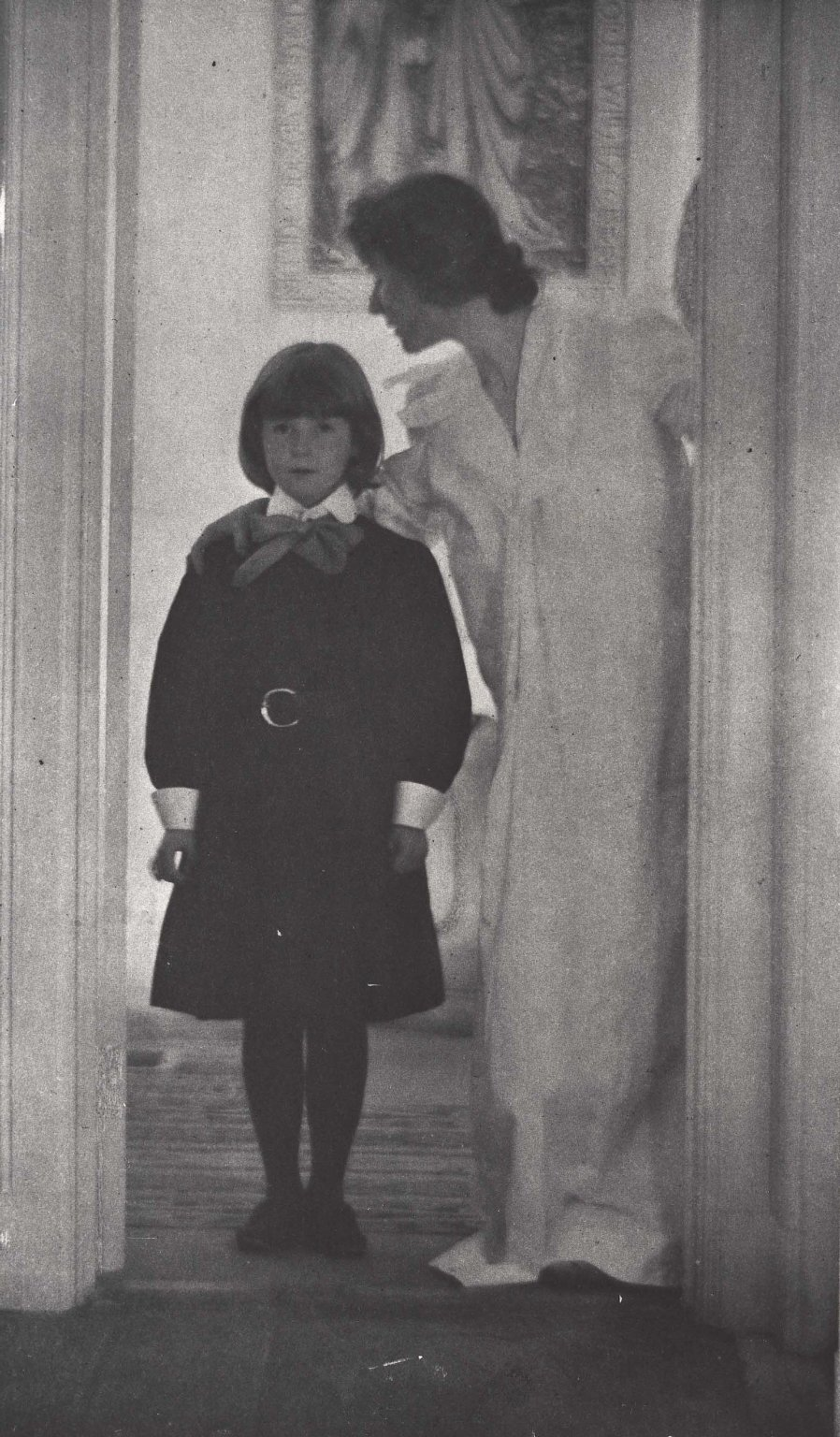
Blessed Art Thou Among Women by Gertrude Käsebier, 1899. Brooklyn Museum

Photogravure registers a wide variety of tones, through the transfer of etching ink from an etched copper plate to special dampened paper run through an etching press. The unique tonal range comes from photogravure's variable depth of etch, that is, the shadows are etched many times deeper than the highlights. Unlike half-tone processes which vary the size of dot, the depth of ink wells is varied in a photogravure plate. The human eye resolves these fine variations into a continuous tone image.

Photogravure is distinguished from rotogravure in that photogravure uses a flat copper plate etched rather deeply and printed by hand, while in rotogravure, as the name implies, a rotary cylinder is only lightly etched, and it is a factory printing process for newspapers, magazines, and packaging. The Getty Conservation Institute's The Atlas of Analytical Signatures of Photographic Processes provides guidelines for identifying photogravures and distinguishing them from rotogravure prints.

In French, the correct term for photogravure is héliogravure, while the French term photogravure refers to any photo-based etching technique.

== Technique ==
Photogravure plates go through several distinct stages:

- First, a continuous tone film positive is made from the original photographic negative. A smaller negative can be enlarged onto a sheet of film, which is then processed to produce continuous tones with a range of densities.
- The second stage is to sensitize a sheet of pigmented gelatin tissue by immersion into a 3.5% solution of potassium dichromate for 3 minutes. Once dried against an acrylic (Plexiglas, Perspex) surface, it is ready for the next stage.
- The third stage (usually the next day) is to expose the film positive to the sensitized gravure tissue. The positive is placed on top of the sensitized sheet of pigmented gelatin tissue. The sandwich is then exposed to ultraviolet (UV) light. A separate exposure to a very fine stochastic or hard-dot mezzotint screen is made, or alternatively an aquatint grain of asphaltum or rosin is applied and fused to the copperplate usually before the exposed gelatin tissue is adhered to the plate. The UV light travels through the positive and screen (if used) in succession, each time hardening the gelatin in proportion to the degree of light exposed to it.
- The fourth stage is to adhere the exposed tissue to the copper plate. The gelatin tissue is adhered or "laid down" onto the highly polished copper plate under a layer of cool water. It is squeezed into place and the excess water is wiped clear.
- Once adhered, the fifth stage is to use a hot water bath to remove the paper backing and to wash away the softer, unexposed gelatin. The remaining depth of hardened gelatin is relative to the exposure. This layer of hardened gelatin forms a contoured resist on the copper plate. The resist is dried, and the edges and back of the copper are stopped out (staged).
- The sixth stage is to etch the plate in a series of ferric chloride baths, from the densest to slightly more dilute, in steps. The density of these baths is measured in degrees Baumé. The ferric chloride migrates through the gelatin, etching the shadows and blacks under the thinnest areas first. The etching progresses through the tonal scale from dark to light as the plate is moved to successively more dilute baths of ferric chloride. The image is etched onto the copperplate by the ferric chloride, creating a gravure plate with tiny "wells" of varying depth to hold ink. The pattern formed by the aquatint grain or the screen exposure creates minute "lands" around which the etching occurs, giving the copperplate the tooth to hold ink. The "wells" which hold the ink vary in depth, a unique aspect of photogravure.
- The final stage is to print the cleaned plate.

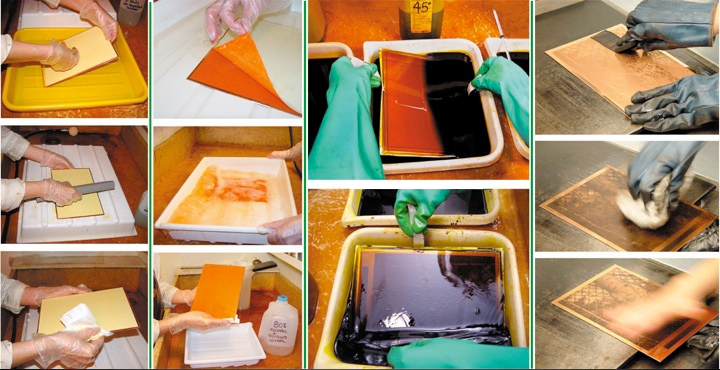
A series of illustrations representing the steps of the photogravure process

=== Printing the plate ===
Printing a photogravure is similar to printing any other intaglio plate, especially a finely etched aquatint. A stiff, oily intaglio printing ink is applied to the whole surface of the plate with a rubber brayer, or a small, stiff squeegee, or a rolled tamper. The plate is then gently wiped with tarlatans to remove the excess ink and drive it into the recesses (wells). It is finally wiped with the fatty part of the palm of the hand in quick glancing strokes. This removes all remaining ink from the polished highlights and high points and leaves ink only in the etched recesses. After the edges are cleaned, the plate is placed on the printing bed of an intaglio press. It is covered with a sheet of dampened rag paper and then two to three layers of thin wool blankets. It is then run through the press at high pressure. The high pressure pushes the fibers of the dampened paper into the wells of the plate which then transfers the ink onto the paper thereby creating the impression. The paper is carefully peeled off the plate and placed between blotters and weighted so it will dry flat. The plate can now be re-inked for another impression or it can be cleaned for storage.

Macdermid Autotype, the last manufacturer of the gelatin pigment paper (tissue) needed to make traditional copper plate photogravure, announced the end of their production in August 2009. Since then, other manufacturers, including Bostick & Sullivan, Phoenix Gravure, and others in India, Taiwan, and Japan have begun supplying gelatin pigment paper (resist tissue) to the market. These products are used by practitioners of traditional photogravure etching and by commercial printers.

== Alternatives ==
=== Digital direct-to-plate photogravure ===
Donald Farnsworth at the art workshop Magnolia Editions developed a digital direct-to-plate photogravure process that does not use gelatin. Instead, a series of 'masks' (layers of resist) are printed onto a copper plate using a flatbed UV cured acrylic printer: "The flatbed printer allows us to etch a stochastic [random] dot pattern into the plate in a completely controlled, precise way ... This process is an inversion of the traditional photogravure method, where you're etching through a sheet of gelatin, and gradually the gelatin is getting thinner and more acid reaches the plate, so the last thing that's etched are the light tones." Instead, the digital direct-to-plate method requires that the light values be etched first; then the printer is used to lay down a new layer of ink onto the plate between acid baths, masking out the lighter values to protect them from subsequent etches. The initial mask looks like it has barely been printed; the masks grow in density until the plate eventually appears almost completely black.

In another variation of the traditional process, where the acid baths are increasingly watered down as the process unfolds, the direct-to-plate process begins with a weak bath and is gradually etched in baths which are increasingly acidic.

=== Photo-polymergravure/polymer photogravure ===
Photopolymer plates, usually used for relief and letterpress printing, can be used to make photogravure plates. These polymer plates, when developed, are a hard plastic, which allows for more impressions to be made than the original copper, which must be steel-faced to protect the soft copper if more than a dozen impressions will be made. Some feel that they rival the quality of traditional copper plate photogravure, while others find that the lack of differential depth in the polymer coating compromises quality.

The process involves a series of exposures of the polymer plate. First, it is exposed under strong light with a random dot screen placed on top of it (called an aquatint screen in fine art printing or a stochastic screen in commercial printing). Next, the plate is exposed to a positive transparency of an image. This transparency can be a continuous tone positive on film, but is most often made as a digital 'positive' (made in the same way as a digital negative) printed with an inkjet printer. The plate is then developed; for most types and brands of plates, this is done in water.

After proper drying and curing, the plate can be inked and printed. The dual exposures produce an "etched" polymer plate with many thousands of indentations of varying depth which hold ink, which in turn are transferred as a continuous tone image to a sheet of paper. Depending on the quality, the resulting print may look similar to or the same as those produced with the traditional photogravure process, though without the same amount of three-dimensional depth on the surface of the plate, and arguably, the print itself.

Two polymer plates commonly in use are Printight plates made by the Toyobo Corporation and Solarplates.

== Gallery ==
Examples of photogravure
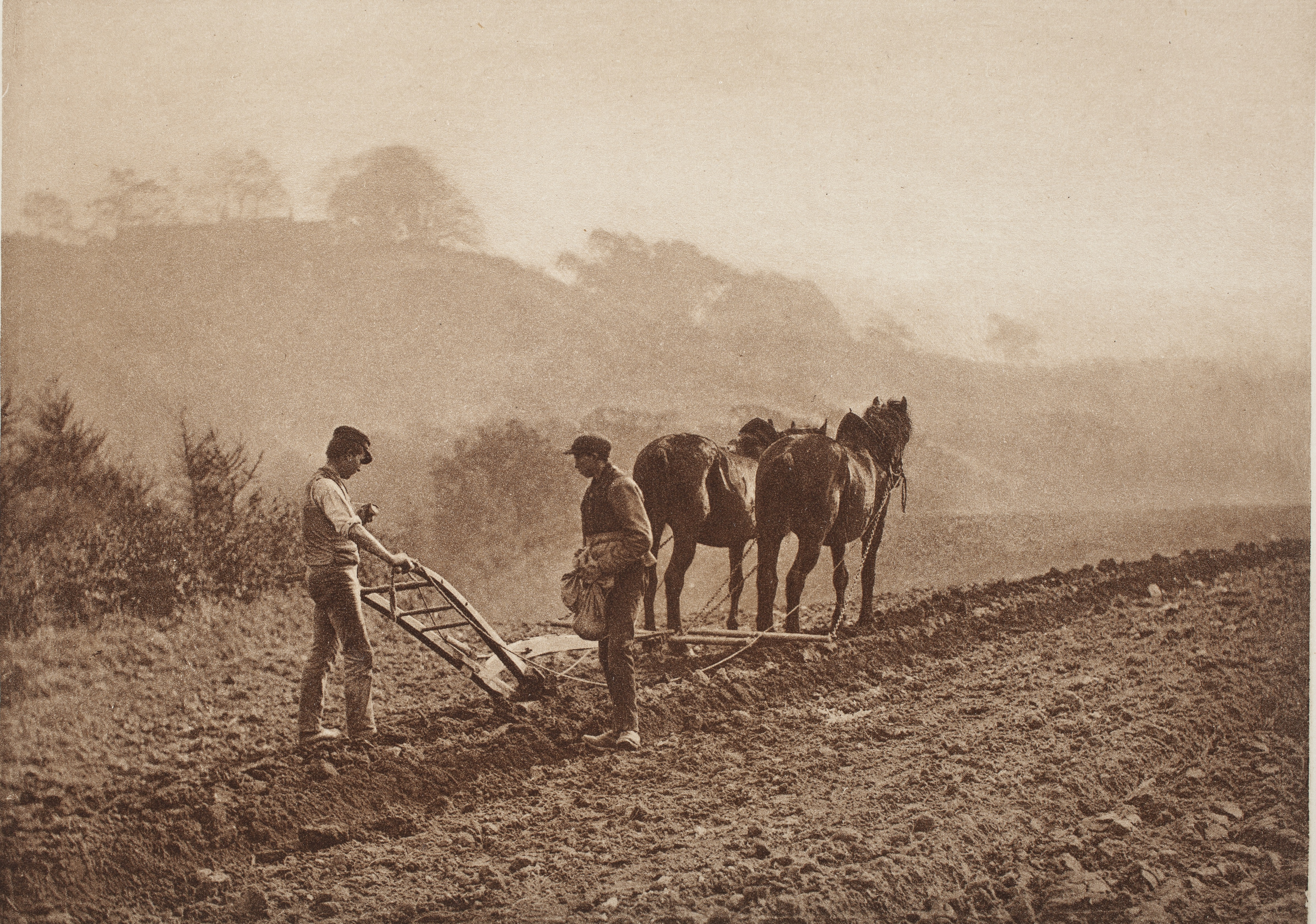
Francis Meadow Sutcliffe, Dinnertime, late 19th-century, sepia color photogravure of a single photograph

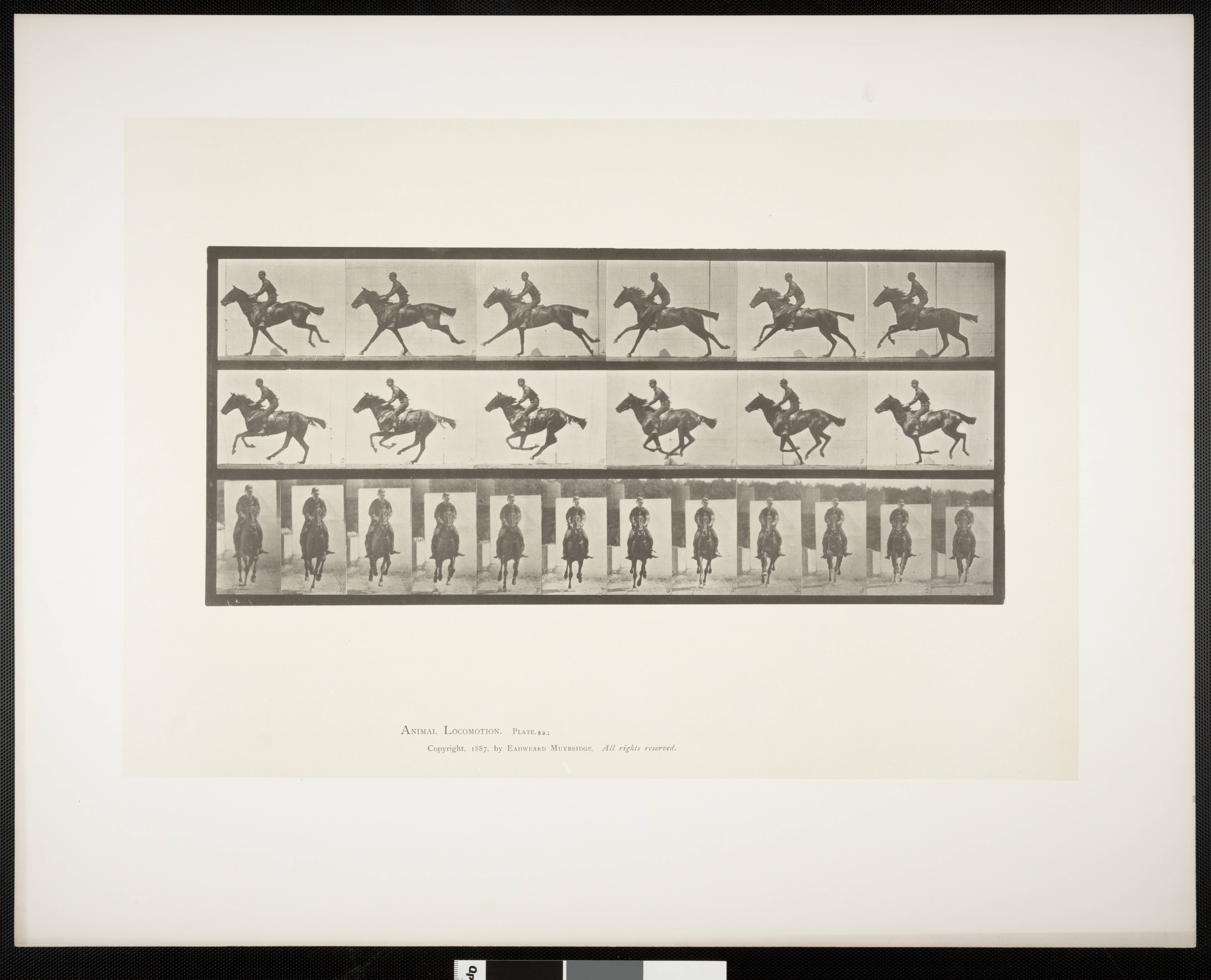
Photogravure print of many different photographs taken by Eadweard Muybridge for Animal Locomotion, published in 1887.

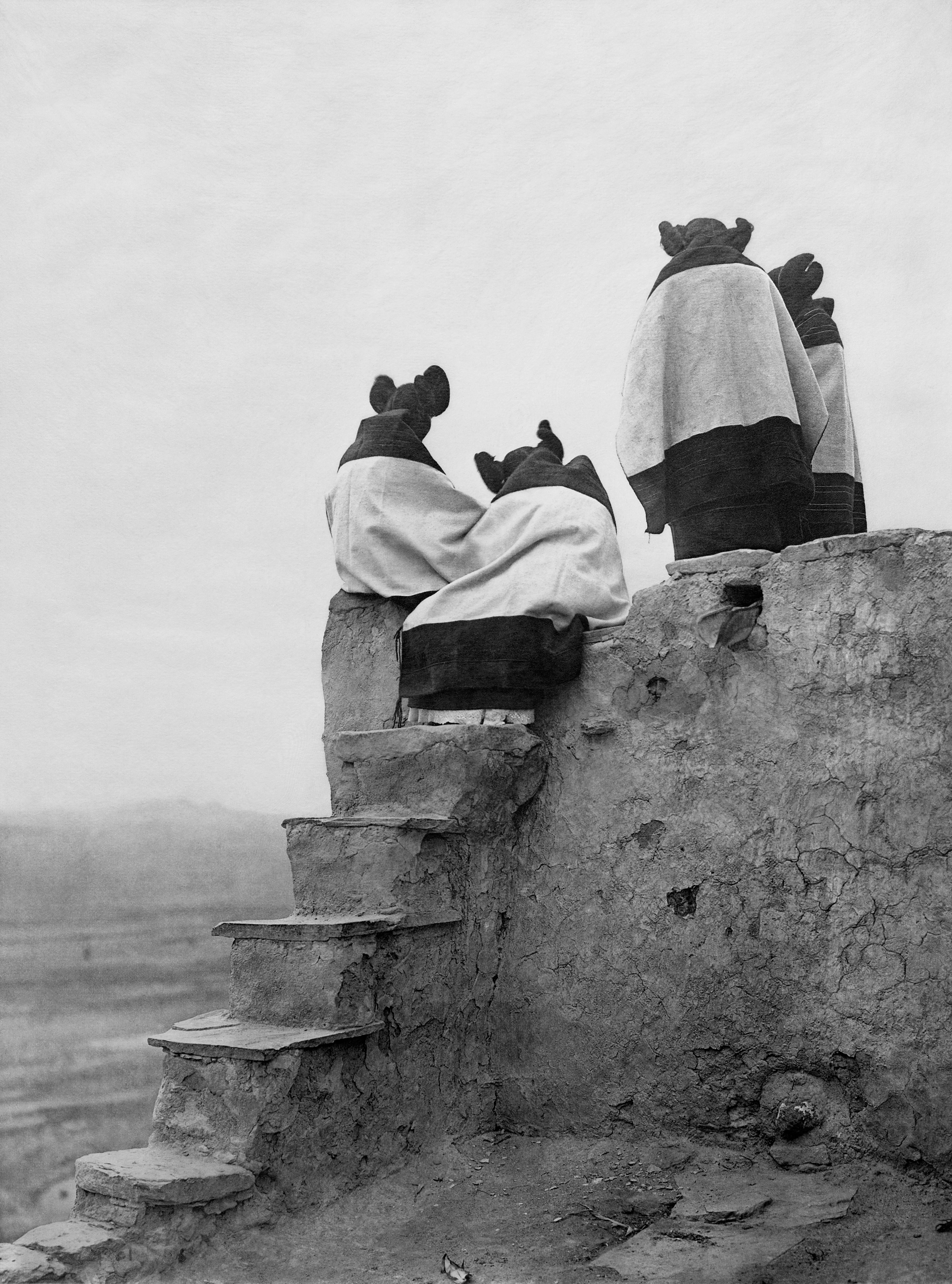
Edward S. Curtis, Watching the Dancers , 1906, four young Hopi women are watching dancers in Walpi, Arizona from an adobe rooftop.

== See also ==
- Photoengraving
