= The Ballad of Oriana =

Poem by Tennyson

- by Alfred Tennyson
- Publication date: 1830
- Lines: 55 (66)

Full text
- The Ballad of Oriana at Wikisource

"The Ballad of Oriana" is an early poem by Alfred Tennyson, published in 1830, but not in 1833.

== Background ==
According to critic John Churton Collins, "This fine ballad was evidently suggested by the old ballad of "Helen of Kirkconnel", both poems being based on a similar incident, and both being the passionate soliloquy of the bereaved lover, though Tennyson's treatment of the subject is his own."

"Helen of Kirkconnel" was one of the poems which he was fond of reciting. Fitzgerald maintains that he used to recite this poem, in a way not to be forgotten, at Cambridge tables.

== Text ==
My heart is wasted with my woe, Oriana. There is no rest for me below, Oriana. When the long dun wolds are ribb’d with snow, And loud the Norland whirlwinds blow, Oriana, Alone I wander to and fro, Oriana. Ere the light on dark was growing, Oriana, At midnight the cock was crowing, Oriana: Winds were blowing, waters flowing, We heard the steeds to battle going, Oriana; Aloud the hollow bugle blowing, Oriana. In the yew-wood black as night, Oriana, Ere I rode into the fight, Oriana, While blissful tears blinded my sight By star-shine and by moonlight, Oriana, I to thee my troth did plight, Oriana. She stood upon the castle wall, Oriana: She watch’d my crest among them all, Oriana: She saw me fight, she heard me call, When forth there stept a foeman tall, Oriana, Atween me and the castle wall, Oriana. The bitter arrow went aside, Oriana: The false, false arrow went aside, Oriana: The damned arrow glanced aside, And pierced thy heart, my love, my bride, Oriana! Thy heart, my life, my love, my bride, Oriana! Oh! narrow, narrow was the space, Oriana. Loud, loud rung out the bugle’s brays, Oriana. Oh! deathful stabs were dealt apace, The battle deepen’d in its place, Oriana; But I was down upon my face, Oriana.	They should have stabb’d me where I lay, Oriana! How could I rise and come away, Oriana? How could I look upon the day? They should have stabb’d me where I lay, Oriana; They should have trod me into clay, Oriana. O breaking heart that will not break, Oriana! O pale, pale face so sweet and meek, Oriana! Thou smilest, but thou dost not speak, And then the tears run down my cheek, Oriana: What wantest thou? whom dost thou seek, Oriana? I cry aloud: none hear my cries, Oriana. Thou comest atween me and the skies, Oriana. I feel the tears of blood arise Up from my heart unto my eyes, Oriana. Within my heart my arrow lies, Oriana. O cursed hand! O cursed blow! Oriana! O happy thou that liest low, Oriana! All night the silence seems to flow Beside me in my utter woe, Oriana. A weary, weary way I go, Oriana. When Norland winds pipe down the sea, Oriana, I walk, I dare not think of thee, Oriana. Thou liest beneath the greenwood tree, I dare not die and come to thee, Oriana. I hear the roaring of the sea, Oriana.

== Sources ==
- Collins, John Churton, ed. (1900). The Early Poems of Alfred, Lord Tennyson. London: Methuen & Co. pp. xv–xvi, xxi, xxv, 36–39.
- Tennyson, Hallam (1898). Alfred Lord Tennyson: A Memoir by His Son. Vol. 1. New York: The Macmillan Company. pp. 48, 92, 286, 503.
