= The Deserted House =

1830 poem by Alfred, Lord Tennyson

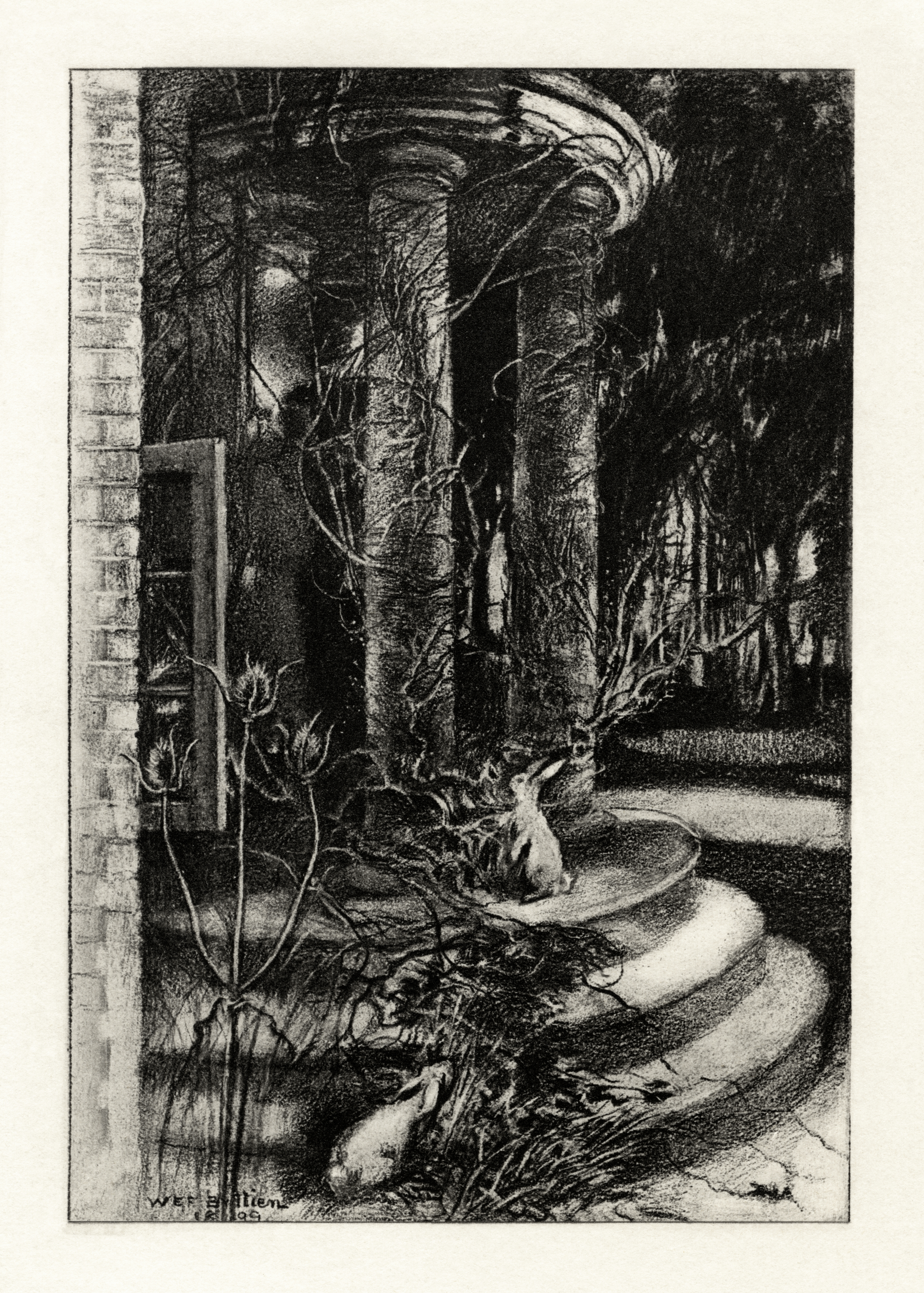
Illustration by William Britten accompanying "The Deserted House"

"The Deserted House" is a poem written by Alfred, Lord Tennyson in 1830, as part of his collection Poems, Chiefly Lyrical. The poem is characterised by its reliance on short lines which alternate in rhyme and meter to prevent a felicitous feel. In the poem, Tennyson uses the image of a dark house as a metaphor for a dead body.

== Background ==
"The Deserted House" was printed along with other poems of Tennyson's juvenilia in his collection, Poems, Chiefly Lyrical of 1830. The poem was printed alongside works that included "The Dying Swan", "The Mystic", "Ode to Memory", "The Sleeping Beauty", and the later suppressed poem, "The Grasshopper".

== Poem ==
The poem exhibits lyrical economy with its reliance on short lines. The lines themselves alternate in rhyme and meter in a manner that keeps the poem from having a felicitous feel to it. The first four stanzas of the poem describe the emptiness of a house, while the fifth, final stanza reveals that the empty house is a metaphor for a dead body after the soul has left.

Life and Thought have gone away
Side by side,
Leaving door and windows wide:
Careless tenants they!

All within is dark as night:
In the windows is no light:
And no murmur at the door,
So frequent on its hinge before.

Close the door, the shutters close,
Or thro' the windows we shall see
The nakedness and vacancy
Of the dark deserted house.

Come away: no more of mirth
Is here or merry-making sound.
The house was builded of the earth,
And shall fall again to ground.

Come away: for Life and Thought
Here no longer dwell;
But in a city glorious—
A great and distant city—have bought
A mansion incorruptible.
Would they could have stayed with us.

== Themes ==
Tennyson's use of allegory in "The Deserted House" established a method that he later developed into "parabolic drift", the term he used to describe his metaphoric style in Idylls of the King. The specific allegory, the use of a dark house as a metaphor for a dead body, reappears in the seventh part of Tennyson's In Memoriam; the Hallam house represents the narrator's dead friend, Arthur. Throughout Tennyson's poetry, the mood of a poem is transmitted through the scenery. To Tennyson, empty space represented the remoteness of an individual, and this theme appears in many of his works including The Lady of Shalott in the form of a quiet island and in Oenone as a quiet valley. In Mariana, the landscape is isolated and brooding, which reflects on her solitude, but the noises of the scene fill it with the life that is lacking in "The Deserted House".

In many of Tennyson's works, he connected the idea of God to a dying civilisation. Before "The Deserted House", the image appears in "Babylon", "The Fall of Jerusalem", "Persia", and "Timbuctoo". Although the theme is different in "The Deserted House", the poem still describes a decaying body that is present with the narrator while an incorruptible house exists in a distant location.

Out of a possible response to Tennyson's death, Evelyn De Morgan painted Life and Thought Have Gone Away, a work that is based on "The Deserted House". With the painting, she excerpted part of the poem dealing with "Life" and "Thought", two ideas that she personified in her artwork. Her depiction of Life is one that is in action, wearing armour, and carries a spear, while Thought is a female in thought, wearing a robe and carrying a book. The actual house, in De Morgan's interpretation, was a sepulcher. In the background of her work is a depiction of a city with angels along a path that leads towards it. Another aspect of the painting is the depiction of the soul leaving the body and travelling to the afterlife. She added a fig tree as a possible representation of original sin or as a representation of a path towards paradise.

== Critical response ==
An anonymous review in Blackwood's Edinburgh Magazine for May 1832 argues, "Mr Tennyson, when he chooses, can say much in few words. A fine example of that is shewn in five few-syllabled four-lined stanzas on a Deserted House. Every word tells; and the short whole is most pathetic in its completeness-let us say perfection-like some old Scottish air sung by maiden at her wheel-or shepherd in the wilderness." Walt Whitman characterises Tennyson's works saying, "There is such a latent charm in mere words, cunning collocutions, and in the voice ringing them, which he has caught, and brought out beyond all others [...] evidenced in The Lady of Shalott, The Deserted House, and many other pieces."

In describing the poem, an anonymous review in the 1884 Sunday Magazine says "Beautiful it was in art, music, and imagination; but there was something more than a general expression of awe about it." William Dawson, in his 1890 review of English poets, included "The Deserted House" in poems of Tennyson that represented his "fineness of workmanship and depth of feeling". Later in 1899, Stephen Gwynn argues, "Even among the Juvenilia, The Deserted House is not easy to forget".
