= Claribel (poem) =

Poem by Alfred Tennyson

- by Alfred Tennyson
- Genre(s): Romanticism
- Meter: Iambic trimeter
- Rhyme scheme: Irregular
- Publication date: 1830; 1842; 1851
- Lines: 21

Full text
- Poems (Tennyson, 1843)/Volume 1/Claribel at Wikisource

"Claribel: A Melody" is an early poem by Alfred Tennyson, first published in 1830.

== Text ==
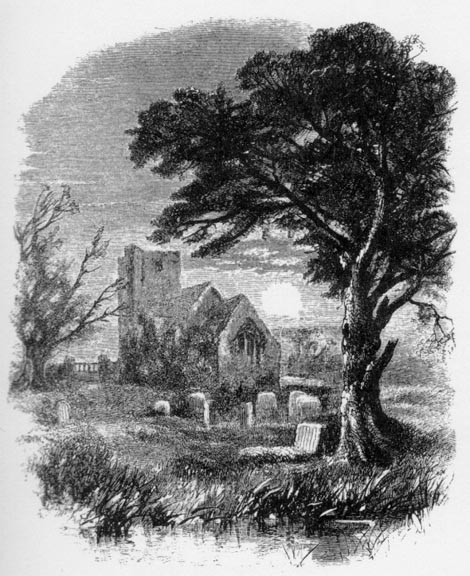
Illustration for Tennyson's "Claribel", engraved by T. Williams after Thomas Creswick, 1857

In the 1830 and 1842 editions the poem is in one long stanza, with a full stop in the 1830 edition after line 8; the 1842 edition omits the full stop. The name "Claribel" may have been suggested by Spenser, or Shakespeare.

Where Claribel low-lieth
The breezes pause and die,
Letting the rose-leaves fall:
But the solemn oak-tree sigheth,
Thick-leaved, ambrosial,
With an ancient melody
Of an inward agony,
Where Claribel low-lieth.

At eve the beetle boometh
Athwart the thicket lone:
At noon the wild bee (Note: 1830. "Wild" omitted, and "low" inserted with a hyphen before "hummeth".) hummeth
About the moss’d headstone:
At midnight the moon cometh,
And looketh down alone.
Her song the lintwhite swelleth,
The clear-voiced mavis dwelleth,
The callow throstle (Note: 1851 and all previous editions, "fledgling" for "callow".) lispeth,
The slumbrous wave outwelleth,
The babbling runnel crispeth,
The hollow grot replieth
Where Claribel low-lieth.

== Sources ==
- Collins, John Churton, ed. (1900). The Early Poems of Alfred, Lord Tennyson. London: Methuen & Co. pp. 2–3.
