= The Kraken (poem) =

Sonnet by Alfred Tennyson

"The Kraken" is a poem by Alfred Tennyson (1809–1892) that describes the Kraken, a mythical creature. It was published in Tennyson's Poems, Chiefly Lyrical (1830).

The critic Christopher Ricks writes that it is among the best poems in the volume, all of which originate in Tennyson's "despondency". In "The Kraken," writes Robert Preyer, a "very early work, one already sees a magnificent matching of the various technical components to secure an effect that is intense, strange, remote, and curiously suggestive and impersonal."

The Kraken and the poem has been widely referenced in popular culture.

== Text ==
Below the thunders of the upper deep;
Far, far beneath in the abysmal sea,
His ancient, dreamless, uninvaded sleep
The Kraken sleepeth: faintest sunlights flee
About his shadowy sides: above him swell
Huge sponges of millennial growth and height;
And far away into the sickly light,
From many a wondrous grot and secret cell
Unnumber’d and enormous polypi
Winnow with giant arms the slumbering green.
There hath he lain for ages and will lie
Battening upon huge seaworms in his sleep,
Until the latter fire shall heat the deep;
Then once by man and angels to be seen,
In roaring he shall rise and on the surface die.

== Form ==
Although the poem has fifteen lines, authorities still accept it as a sonnet. One adds that the ABABCDDCEFEAAFE rhyme scheme of three quatrains and a concluding couplet suggests that it is on the Petrarchan (Italian) model rather than the Shakespearean form.

== Background and interpretations ==
Laurence Mazzeno's survey finds "wildly differing interpretations." Some critics saw the Kraken as the image of the poet, imprisoned or isolated either in the creative process or in the mind. Isobel Armstrong read the poem politically, seeing the Kraken as representing the "slumbering political might of the working classes."

Robert Preyer writes that the poem contains "apocalyptic shapes unseen by the ordinary person" and its "oracular voice" tells of "mindless forces" that are capable of "exploding to the surface in a burst of irrational frenzy that marks the end of its peculiar life-in-death, the end of ordinary living, and also the onset of eternity." The poem does not offer rationalization for its vivid images: "the timeless, mythic voice giving utterance to the oracle is exactly right."

== Influences and uses ==
- Benjamin Britten included "The Kraken" in Nocturne, a song-cycle of poems dealing with sleep and darkness.
- John Wyndham's 1953 novel The Kraken Wakes is a reference to Tennyson's sonnet.
- The folk group WYNN's first album, Tales from Nowhere, included a song called "The Kraken".
- The poem was reprinted in the February 1951 issue of The Magazine of Fantasy & Science Fiction.
