= Poems, Chiefly Lyrical =

1830 poetry collection by Alfred Tennyson

Poems, Chiefly Lyrical is a poetry collection by Alfred Tennyson, published in June 1830.

== Contents ==
The poems are fifty-six in number:

- Claribel.
- Lilian.
- Isabel.
- Elegiacs.*
- The "How" and the "Why".
- Mariana.
- To —— .
- Madeline.
- The Merman.
- The Mermaid.
- Supposed Confessions of a second-rate sensitive mind not in unity with itself.*
- The Burial of Love.
- To — (Sainted Juliet dearest name.)
- Song. The Owl.
- Second Song. To the same.
- Recollections of the Arabian Nights.
- Ode to Memory.
- Song. (I' the glooming light.)
- Song. (A spirit haunts.)
- Adeline.
- A Character.
- Song. (The lint-white and the throstle cock.)
- Song. (Every day hath its night.)
- The Poet.
- The Poet’s Mind.
- Nothing will die.*
- All things will die.*
- Hero to Leander.
- The Mystic.
- The Dying Swan.
- A Dirge.
- The Grasshopper.
- Love, Pride and Forgetfulness.
- Chorus (in an unpublished drama written very early).
- Lost Hope.
- The Deserted House.*†
- The Tears of Heaven.
- Love and Sorrow.
- To a Lady Sleeping.
- Sonnet. (Could I outwear my present state of woe.)
- Sonnet. (Though Night hath climbed her peak of highest noon.)
- Sonnet. (Shall the hag Evil die with child of Good.)
- Sonnet. (The pallid thunderstricken sigh for gain.)
- Love.
- Love and Death.
- The Kraken.*
- The Ballad of Oriana.
- Circumstance.
- English War Song.
- National Song.
- The Sleeping Beauty.
- Dualisms.
- We are Free.
- The Sea-Fairies.*†
- Sonnet to J.M.K.
- οἱ ῥέοντες.

Of these the poems in italics appeared in the edition of 1842, and were not much altered. Those with an asterisk were, in addition to the italicised poems, afterwards included among the Juvenilia in the collected works (1871–1872), though excluded from all preceding editions of the poems. Those with both a dagger and an asterisk were restored in editions previous to the first collected editions of the works.

== History ==
Poems, Chiefly Lyrical, was published in 1830 by Effingham Wilson, also the publisher of Robert Browning's Paracelsus. The volume had the following title-page: Poems, Chiefly Lyrical, by Alfred Tennyson. London: Effingham Wilson, Royal Exchange, 1830. Favourable reviews appeared by Sir John Bowring in the Westminster, by Leigh Hunt in the Tatler, and by Arthur Hallam in the Englishman's Magazine.

== Sources ==
- Collins, John Churton, ed. (1900). The Early Poems of Alfred, Lord Tennyson. London: Methuen & Co. pp. vii–viii.
- Tennyson, Hallam (1897). Alfred Lord Tennyson: A Memoir by his Son. Vol. 1. London: Macmillan & Co., Ltd. pp. 49–55.
- "Alfred, Lord Tennyson, 1809–1892". Poetry Foundation. 19 July 2017. Accessed 9 June 2022.
- "Poems, Chiefly Lyrical". Encyclopaedia Britannica. 8 December 2016. Accessed 9 June 2022.
