= The Day-Dream =

1842 poem written by Alfred, Lord Tennyson

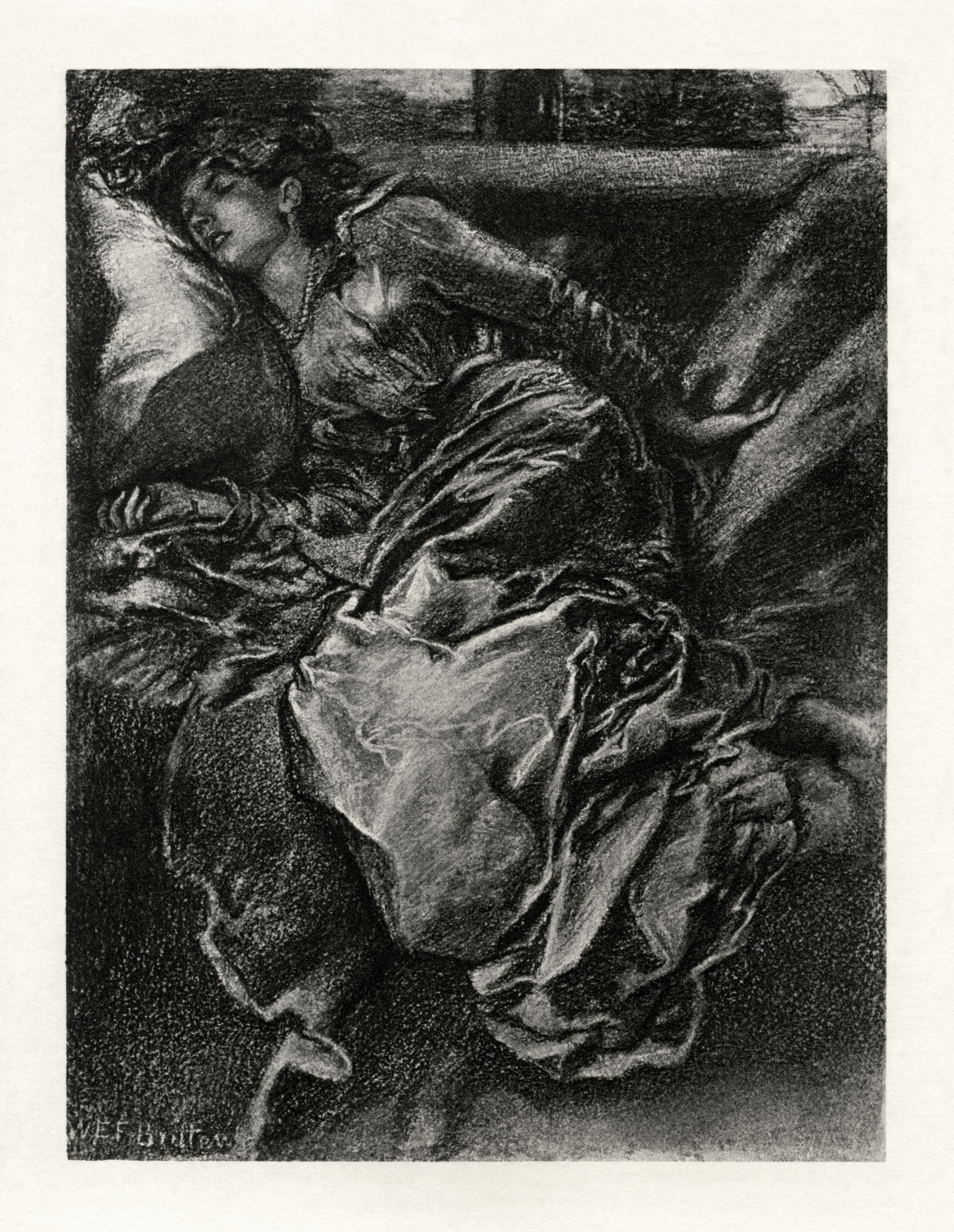
An illustration to the 1830 version of the poem, by W. E. F. Britten (c. 1901)

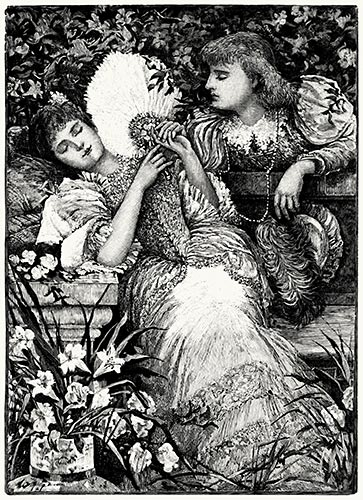
"The maid-of-honour blooming fair, The page has caught her hand in his" —Illustrated under George T. Andrew (New York, c. 1885)

The Day-Dream is a poem written by Alfred Tennyson that was published in 1842. It was an expanded version of his 1830 poem The Sleeping Beauty. It was further altered in 1848 for a dramatic performance for a private gathering with Tennyson starring as the Prince. "The Day-Dream" discusses the nature of sleeping and of dreaming, especially in relation to individuals that would want to escape from reality. The poem also compares the act of poetry with dreaming and asserts that the two are the same.

== Background ==
Tennyson originally published "The Sleeping Beauty" in his 1830 collection of poems. In 1833, Tennyson's close friend Arthur Hallam died. The death greatly affected both Tennyson and his sister Emily, and he kept away from society as he dealt with the pain. By mid-summer 1834, they slowly began to participate together in social events once again. At one occasion, Tennyson, Emily, and their sister Mary were invited to visit friends at Dorking and then travel onwards to see the Hallam family. However, Tennyson set out on his own and spent time alone at Leith Hill, Dorking. It was during this time that he worked on "The Sleeping Beauty" and early versions of Sir Galahad and The Blackbird.

The poem was later expanded into the poem The Day-Dream, which was published in 1842. The poem was altered in 1848 for a dramatic performance for a private gathering. In that version, Tennyson played the part of the Prince who was to wake up the sleeping woman.

== Poem ==
The poem begins by comparing the act of dreaming with the act of composing poetry:

A summer crisp with shining woods.
And I too dream'd, until at last
Across my fancy, brooding warm,
The reflex of a legend past,
And loosely settled into form. ("Prologue" II, lines 1-5)

The poem reverses time and declares that the living, contemporary artists are ancient while those who have died before are the young:

And all that else the years will show,
The Poet-forms of stronger hours,
The vast Republics that may grow,
The Federations and the Powers;
Titanic forces taking birth
In divers seasons, divers climes;
For we are Ancients of the earth
And in the morning of the times ("L'envoi" I 13–20)

== Themes ==
The poem compares the act of poetry with dreaming and says that the two are the same. The dream is able to stimulate the memory of the sleeping woman. Tennyson's earlier works discuss journeys through memory, including "Sense and Conscience", "The Merman", "The Mermaid", and "Recollections of the Arabian Nights". Out of all of Tennyson's poems, The Day-Dream is one of the few that lack a use of irony. The poem relies on a similar theme as Tennyson's "The Lotos-Eaters" in that it talks about a living death state. However, The Day-Dream emphasizes the pleasure in being able to return to a sleep state and avoid reality. However, the poem is similar to other Tennyson poems in that it relies on a frame for the story in a manner similar to "Lady Godive", Morte D'Arthur and The Princess. The character Flora is similar to many of Tennyson's females that resist their fate by desiring death, including the Idyl ladies Rose of The Gardener's Daughter, Ida of The Princess, and Mariana of Mariana.

In relationship to Tennyson's poems, The Day-Dream keeps up with the anti-didact trend and goes as far as to create a moral about not being able to create a moral. Of any possible moral meaning, there is an emphasis on charity and order. The parts of The Day-Dream are related to poems in particular. "L'Envoi" is similar to the themes and ideas of "The Lotos-Eaters". The section "The Revival" is similar to The Princess or "Home They Brought Her Warrior Dead" in its discussion of rebirth and a return to life. Turnbull 1978 In relationship to other works, it is possible that the story of a sleeping woman is the same used by Richard Wagner in Siegfried. The theme is also similar to John Keats's Endymion.

== Critical response ==
Literary critic Arthur Turnbull claims, "This is one of the most artistically executed of Tennyson's creations; he was always fond of the slumberous side of things where music is the voice of the poppy dreams of fancy."
