= William Edward Frank Britten =

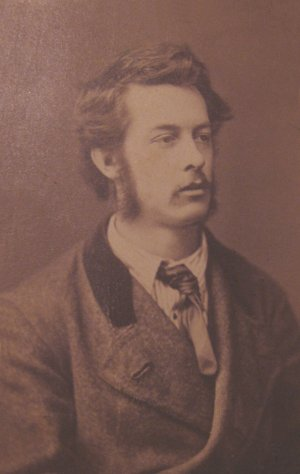
Portrait of artist William Edward Frank Britten 1880.

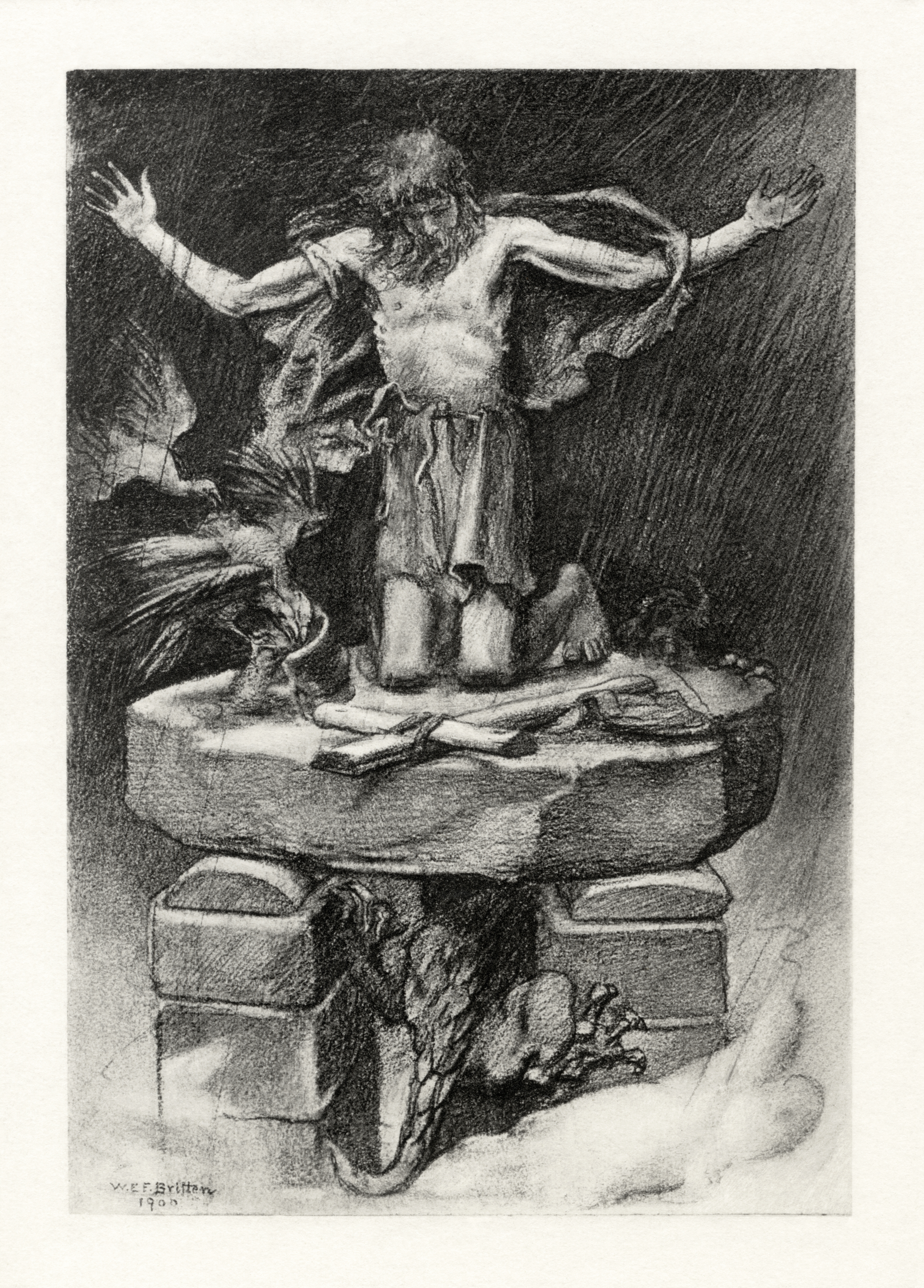
A 1901 photogravure illustration by W. E. F. Britten for Alfred Tennyson's poem St. Simeon Stylites, based on Simeon Stylites, the first of the pillar saints.

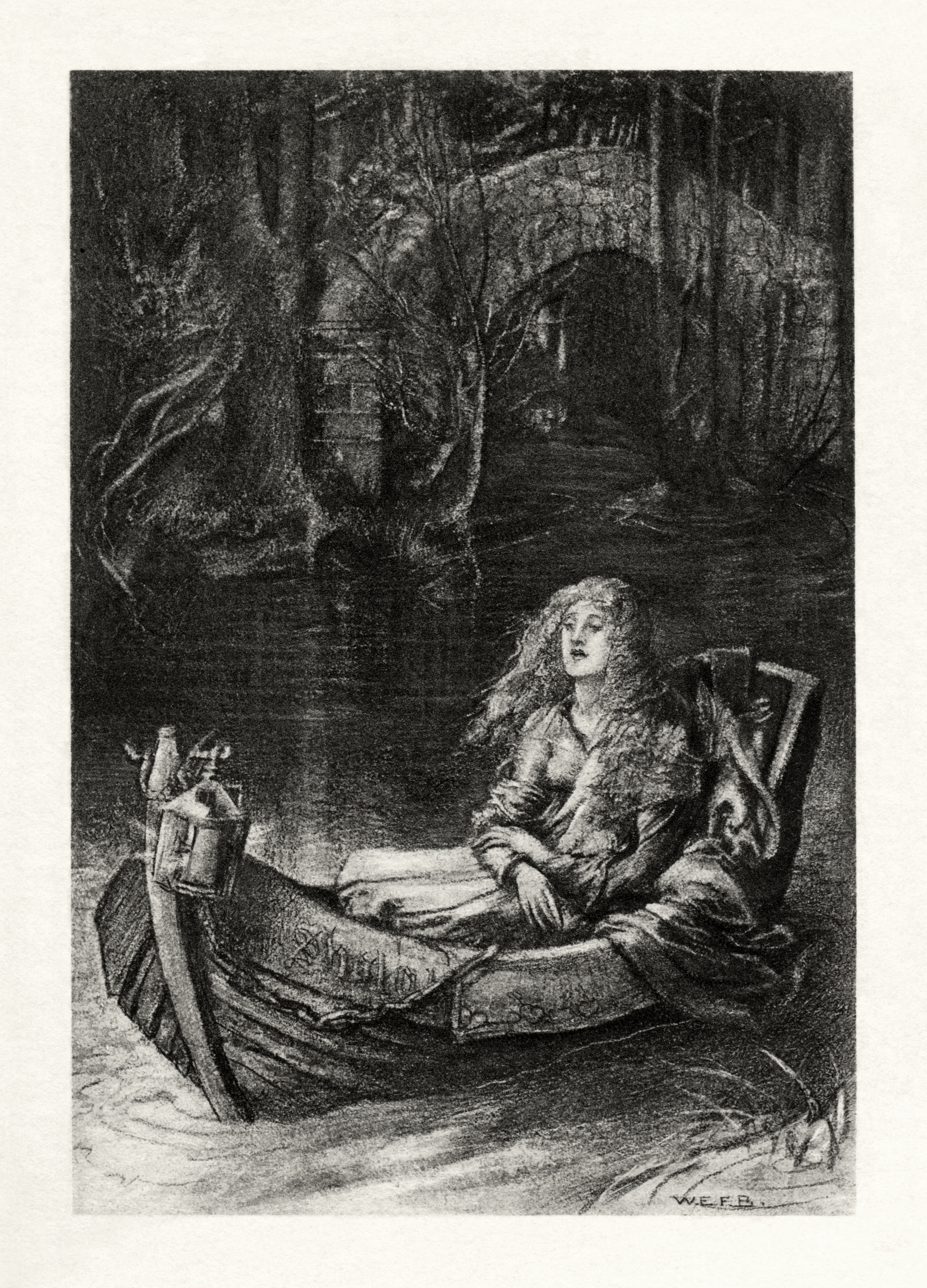
The Lady of Shalott

William Edward Frank Britten (1848 – 1916) was a British painter and illustrator. It is known that he worked in London, England starting in 1873 and that he stayed in the city until at least 1890. Britten's work ranged in style from to traditional Victorian to Pre-Raphaelite, and his artistic medium ranged from paintings to book illustrations. His paintings have mostly been praised by critics with his illustrations having been treated as either neutral or favourable by reviewers.

== Biography ==
William Edward Frank Britten was born in 1848 in Lambeth, London to William Goodwyn Price Britten and Ellen Eliza Richardson. His father abandoned the family in 1862 and later remarried Emma Hardinge Britten in America, without ever formally divorcing Ellen Eliza.

On 23 July 1866, he was admitted to the Royal Academy of Arts in Piccadilly, London, as a probationer and on 3 January 1867 he was accepted as a student. He began to flourish as a painter after 1873, when he began to hold exhibitions for his works at the Royal Society of British Artists. He worked on designs for six of the eight spandrels under the Dome of St Paul's Cathedral in London, including drawing the cartoons for three of the prophets, Jeremiah, Ezekiel and Daniel, after the death of the artist, Alfred Stevens, who had originally been commissioned to draw them but only completed Isaiah. Britten was also approached to provide designs for the remaining four spandrels - representing the four evangelists, the first of which, St Matthew, had been completed to Watts' design in 1866. Once again, Britten completed the scheme - this time passing off some of the work as his own, rather than Watts's. In April 1883, Sir Charles Dilke ordered from Mr. W. E. F. Britten, the painter, whom Leighton had commended to him, a portrait of his brother Ashton who had recently died. It "proved to be very good". In 1891, Britten had Charles Voysey (architect) design a studio for him at 17 St Dunstans Road, London W6 8RD. This building is recognised as one of Voysey's first and best Arts and Crafts buildings and is still extant. Britten spent most of his time working in London and worked as an illustrator and a contributor to magazines. It is known that he was working in the Pimlico area in 1890. There is a suggestion that he worked in Russia for a period on a commission for the Czar, but no firm evidence of this has been found. In c.1912 Britten was giving instruction at the Glasgow School of Art: "Professor W. E. F. Britten superintends figure and landscape composition".

He was married twice; in 1873 to Rebecca Ling (1853–1901) and in 1901 to Rachel Alice Kime (1870–1950); he had four children, two from each marriage. Britten died in 1916 in Kingston, Surrey, England.

== Works ==
Britten followed in the neoclassical tradition of Frederick Leighton and Albert Moore. In terms of actual productions, he ranged from working as a decorative artist to paintings. In style, his designs varied from those that followed the tradition of Victorian classicism to those that were influenced by Pre-Raphaelite paintings. His works are located at the Victoria and Albert Museum.

Britten illustrated the last published poem of Christina Rossetti before her death for the 1894 issue of Magazine of Art. Also, he served as illustrator for:

- Contributions to The Graphic Magazine (1885–1886)
- Algernon Charles Swinburne's Carols of the Year (1893)
- Moira O'Neill's The Elf-Errant (1895)
- Edmund Gosse's translation of Baron de la Motte Fouque's Undine (1896)
- Alfred Tennyson's The Early Poems of Alfred Lord Tennyson (1901), including the poems: The Lady of Shalott, Mariana, "The Deserted House", Oenone, The Lotos-Eaters, St Simeon Stylites, "The Sleeping Beauty", "Sir Galahad", and Break, Break, Break
- Mrs Bellamy's Diamonds (1905)

== Critical reception ==
A contemporary review by Alfred Baldry, in referring to the ceiling panel work Britten created for the South Kensington Museum, says that they "deserve to be praised as true decorations properly conceived and rightly managed." Another contemporary review by Rose Sketchy says that Britten uses a wash technique "with fluency, as is shown by his successful illustrations to Mr. Swinburne's 'Carols of the Year' in the 'Magazine of Art' in 1892-93. Since that time his version of 'Undine,' and illustrations to Tennyson's 'Early Poems,' have shown the same power of graceful composition and sympathey with his subject."

Other reviews on the mentioning the Swinburne series appeared in the January, February, and May issues of The Critic, but they simply acknowledge Britten as the illustrator for that Swinburne's "December", "Carol", and "May". However, two of the reviews were more favourable. A 28 January 1893 review notes, "A sonnet by Swinburne, 'January,' is framed in an interesting drawing by W. E. F. Britten." A review for 6 May 1893, a review claims, "In the series of pictures and sonnets of the months by Mr. W. E. F. Britten and Mr. Algernon Charles Swinburne, both poet and painter have done their best for April".

In the 20th century, art historian Simon Houfe said that Britten "excelled as a decorative artist, placing his subjects in elaborate frames, the Shaftesbury Tribute in The Graphic of 185 is a good example."

== Gallery ==
Complete illustrations for The Early Poems of Alfred, Lord Tennyson (1901)

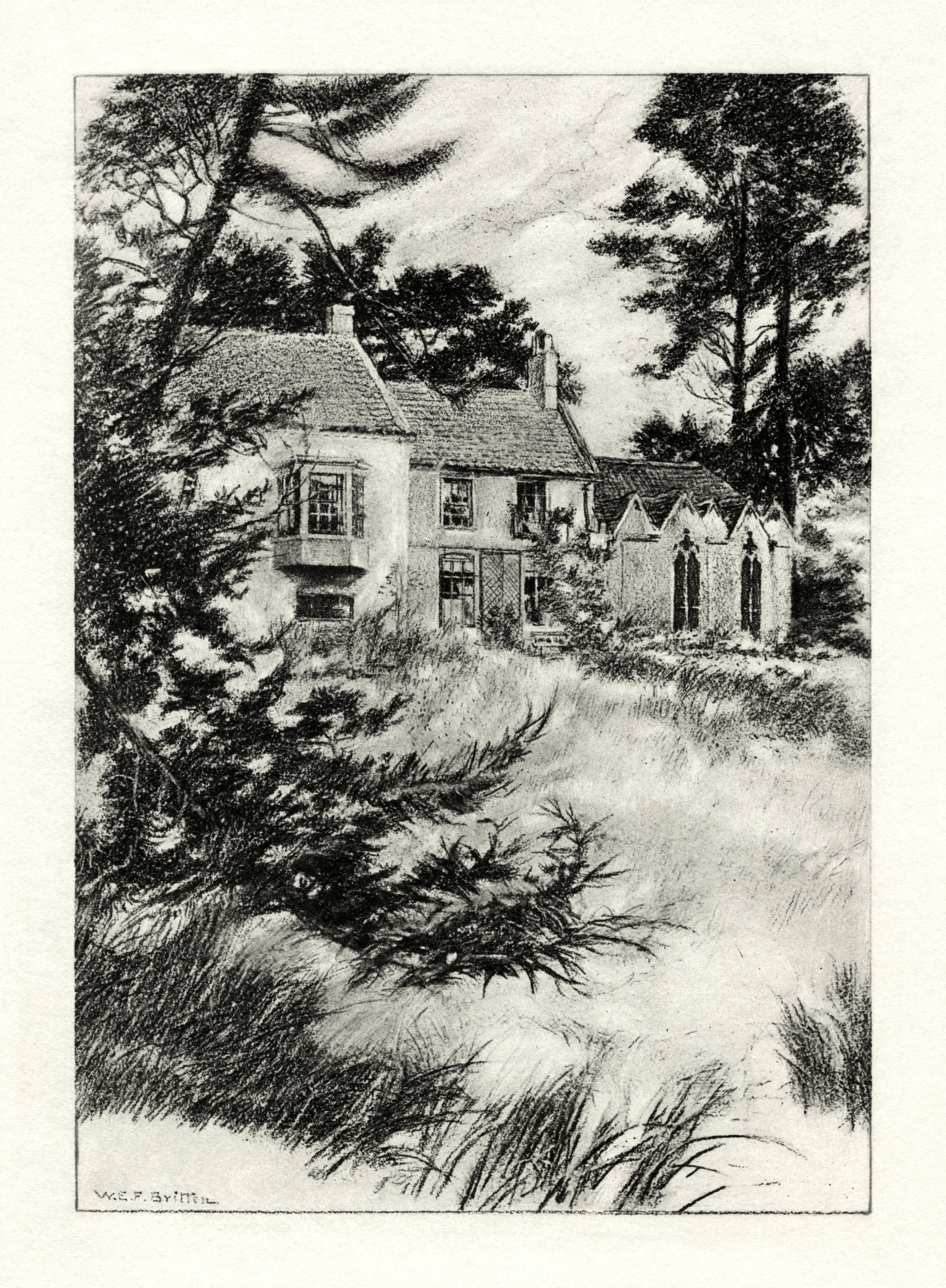
The Garden at Somersby Rectory

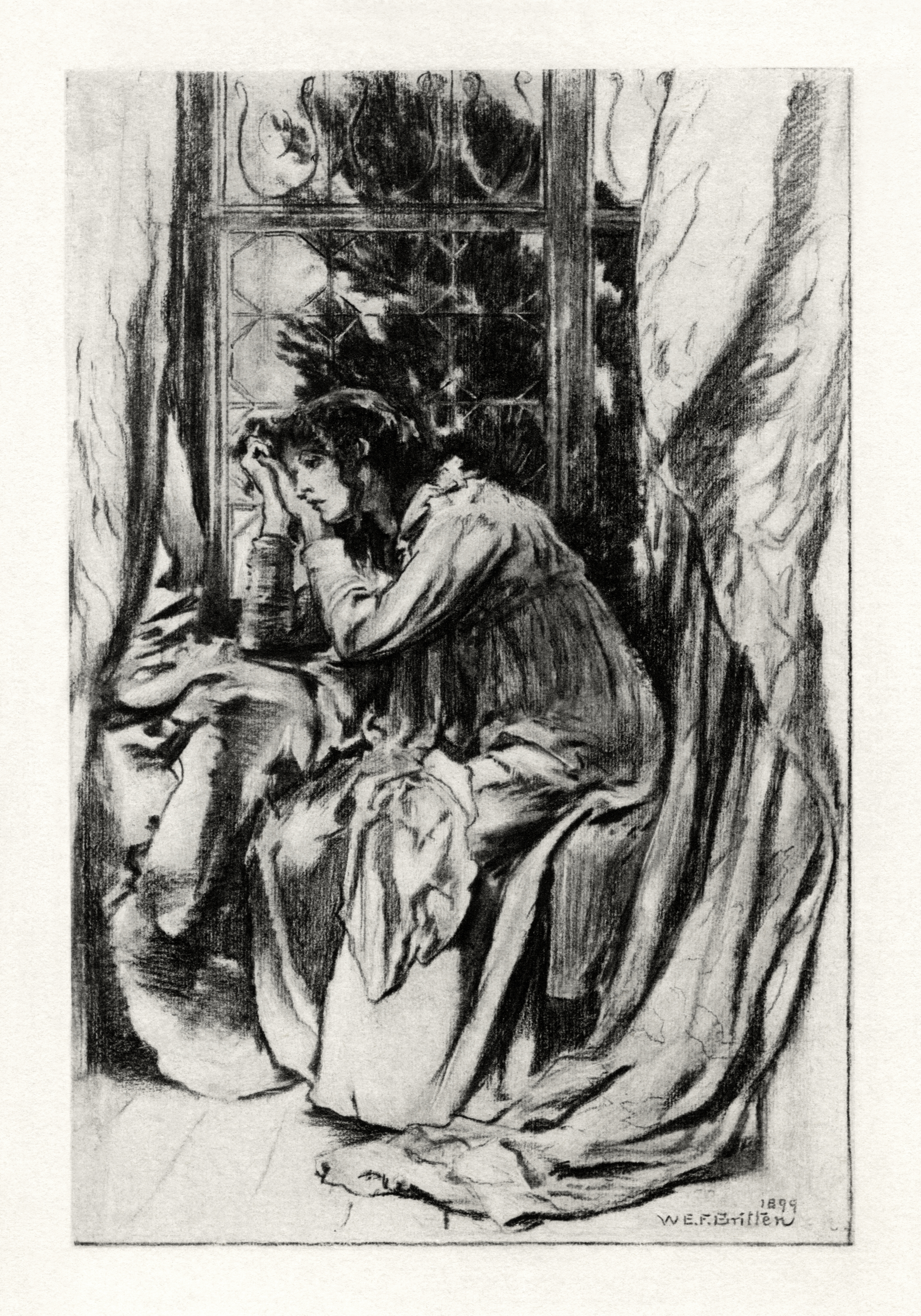
Mariana

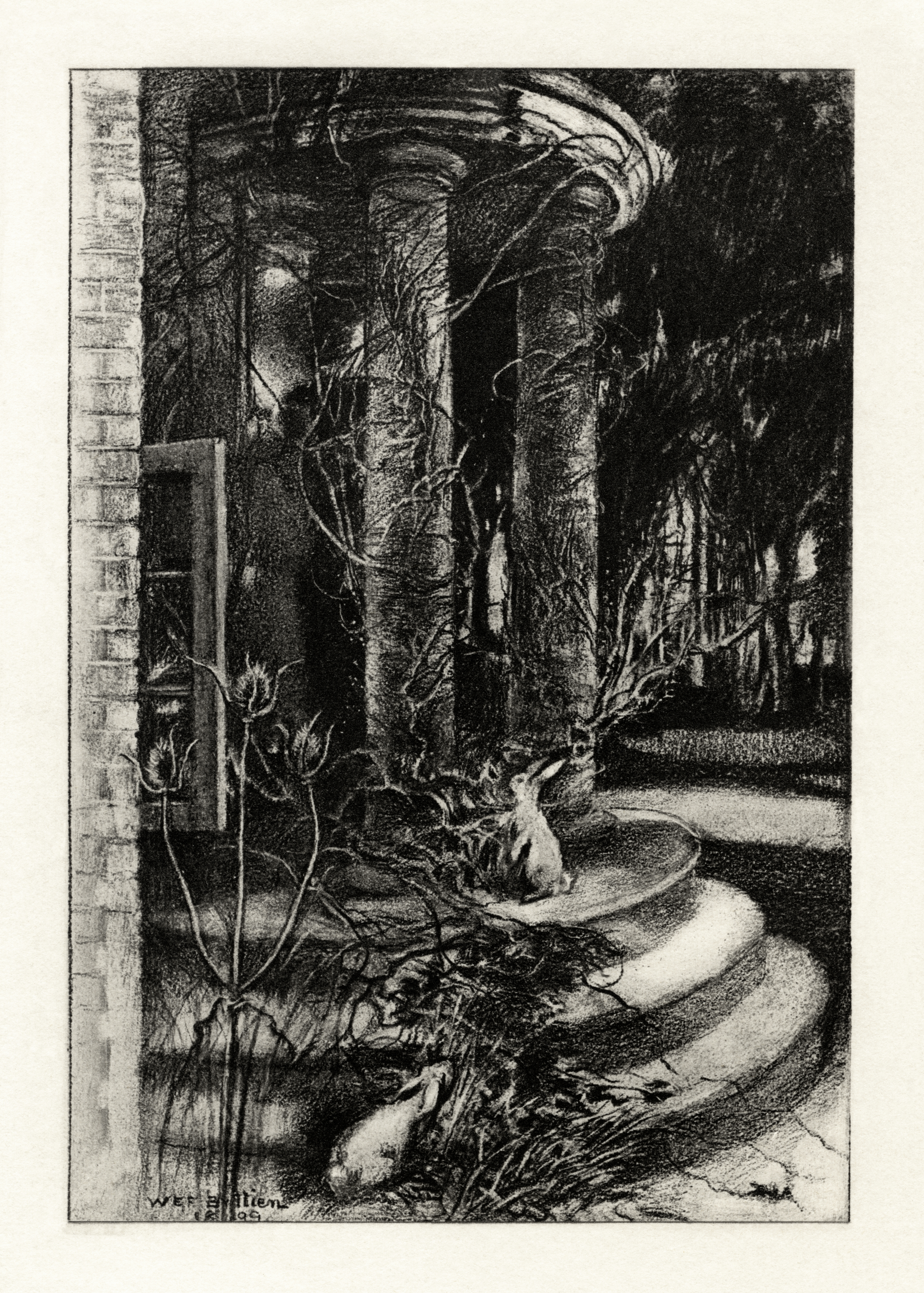
The Deserted House

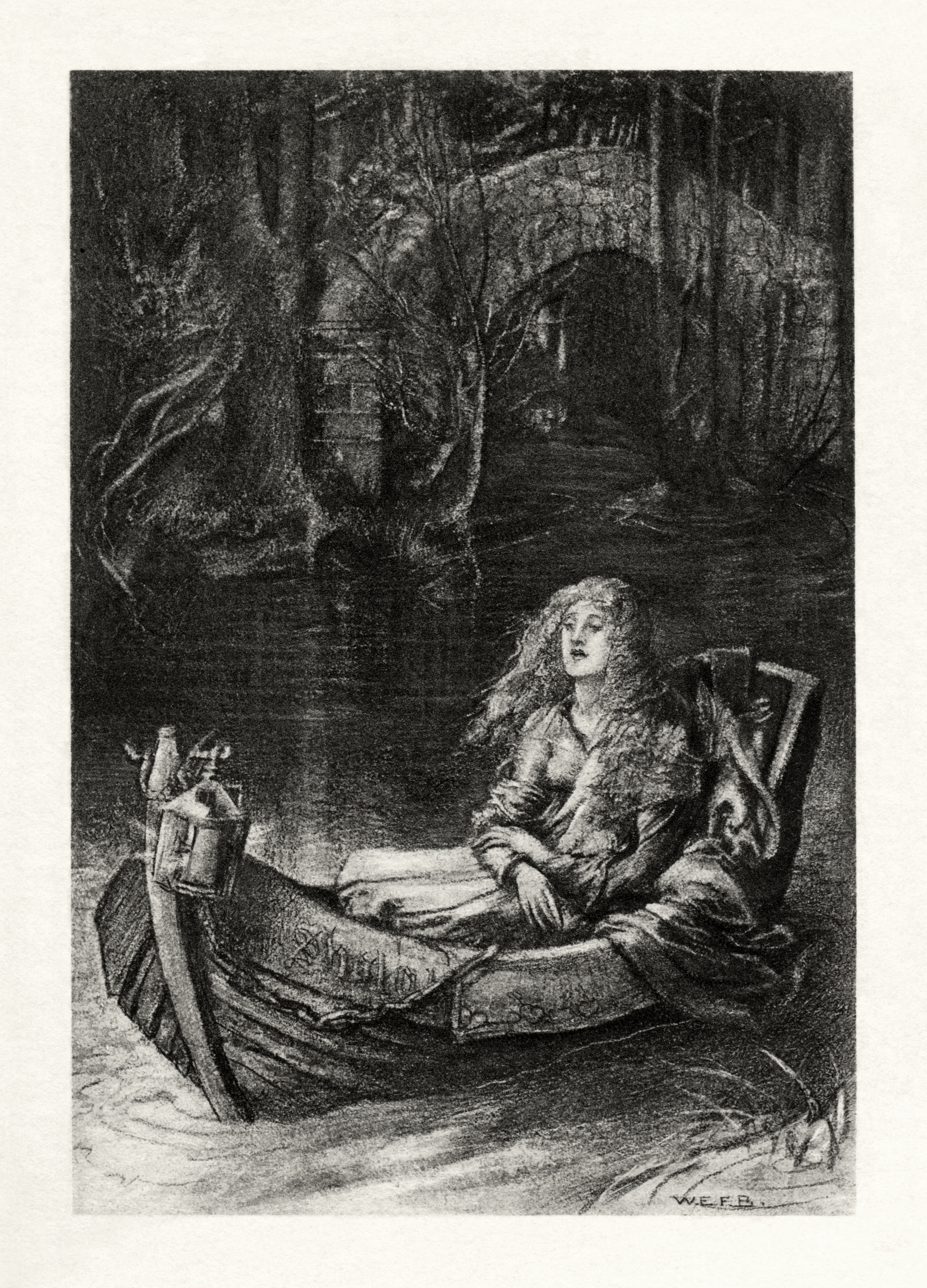
The Lady of Shalott

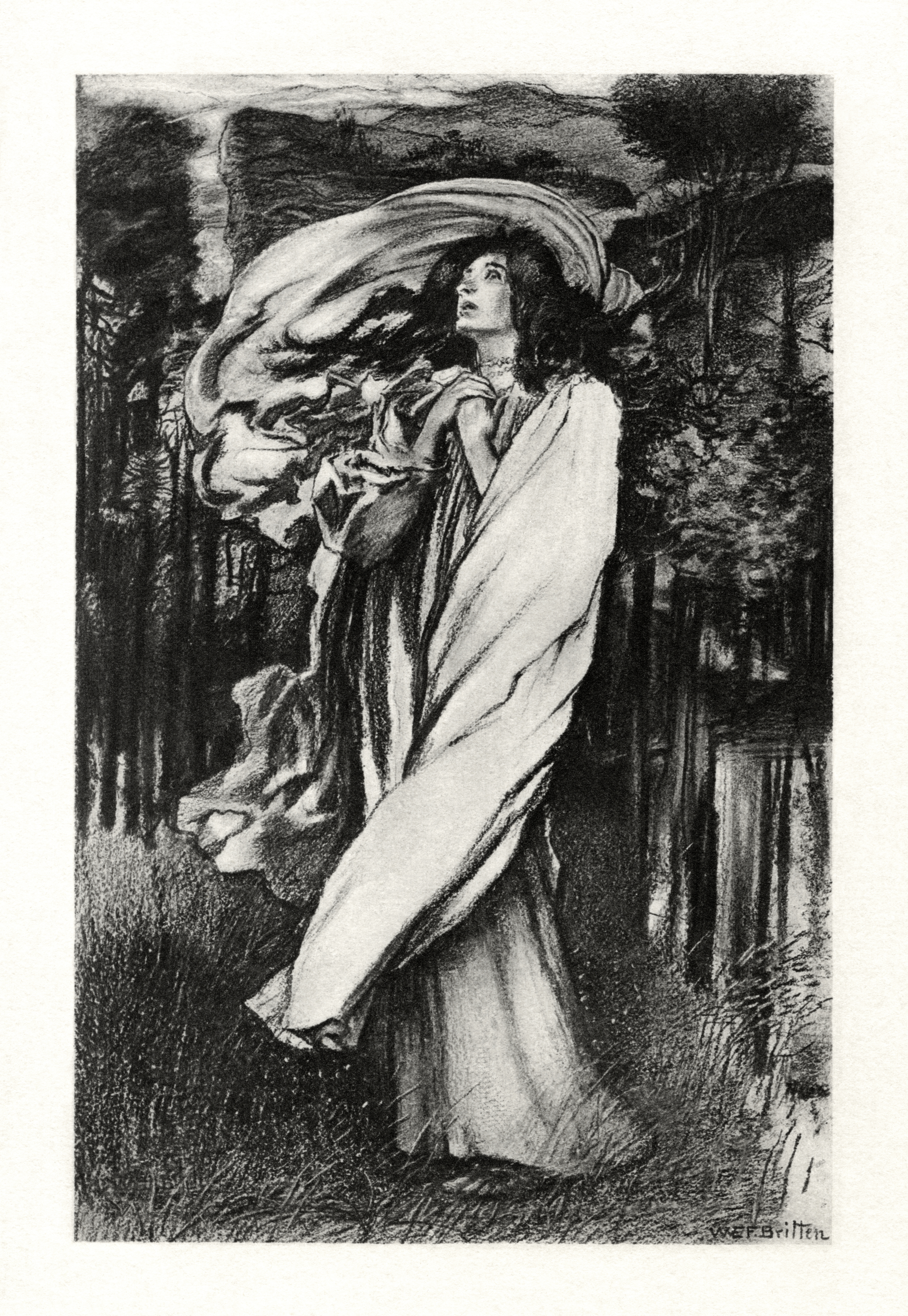
Oenone

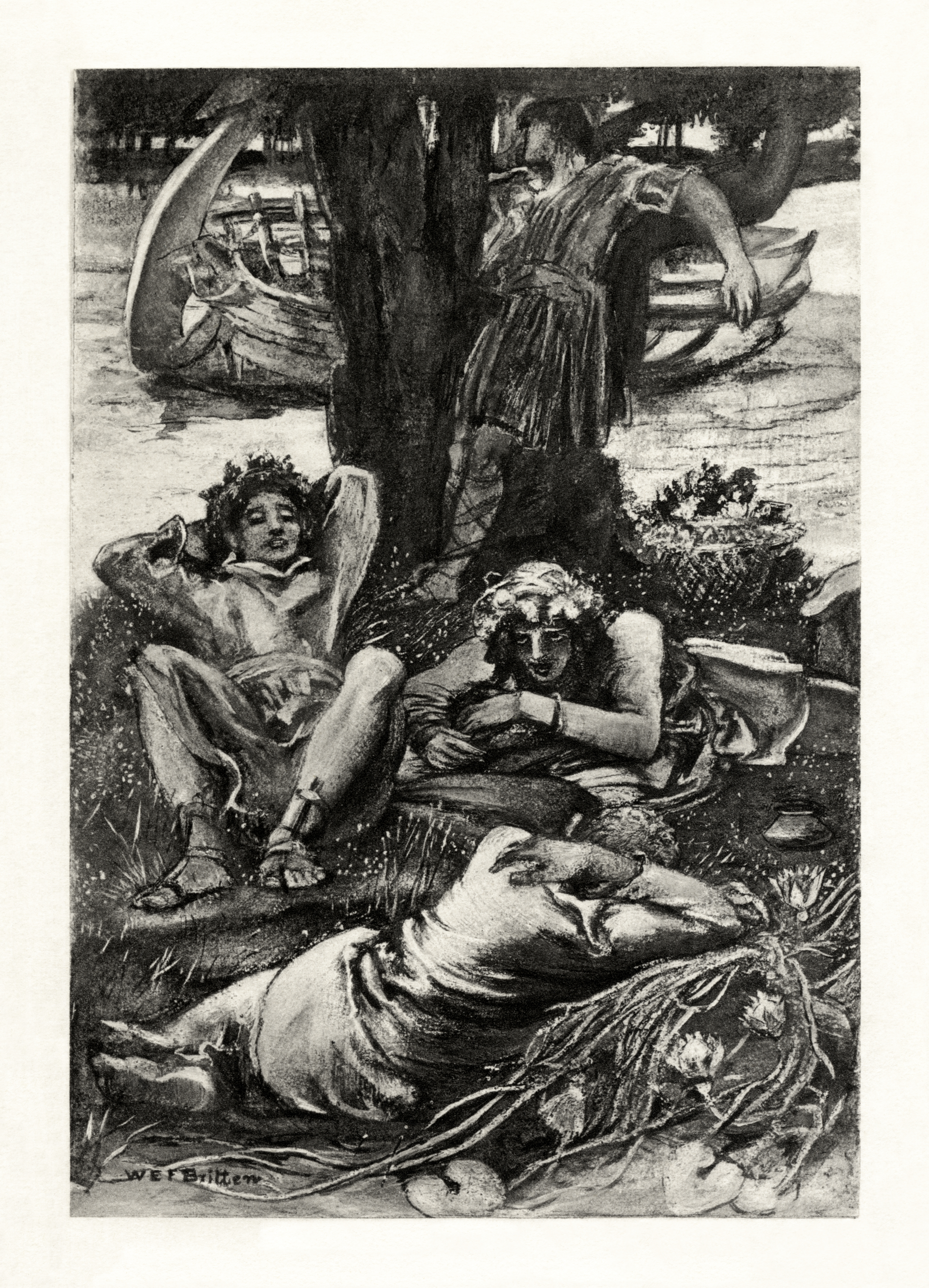
The Lotos-Eaters

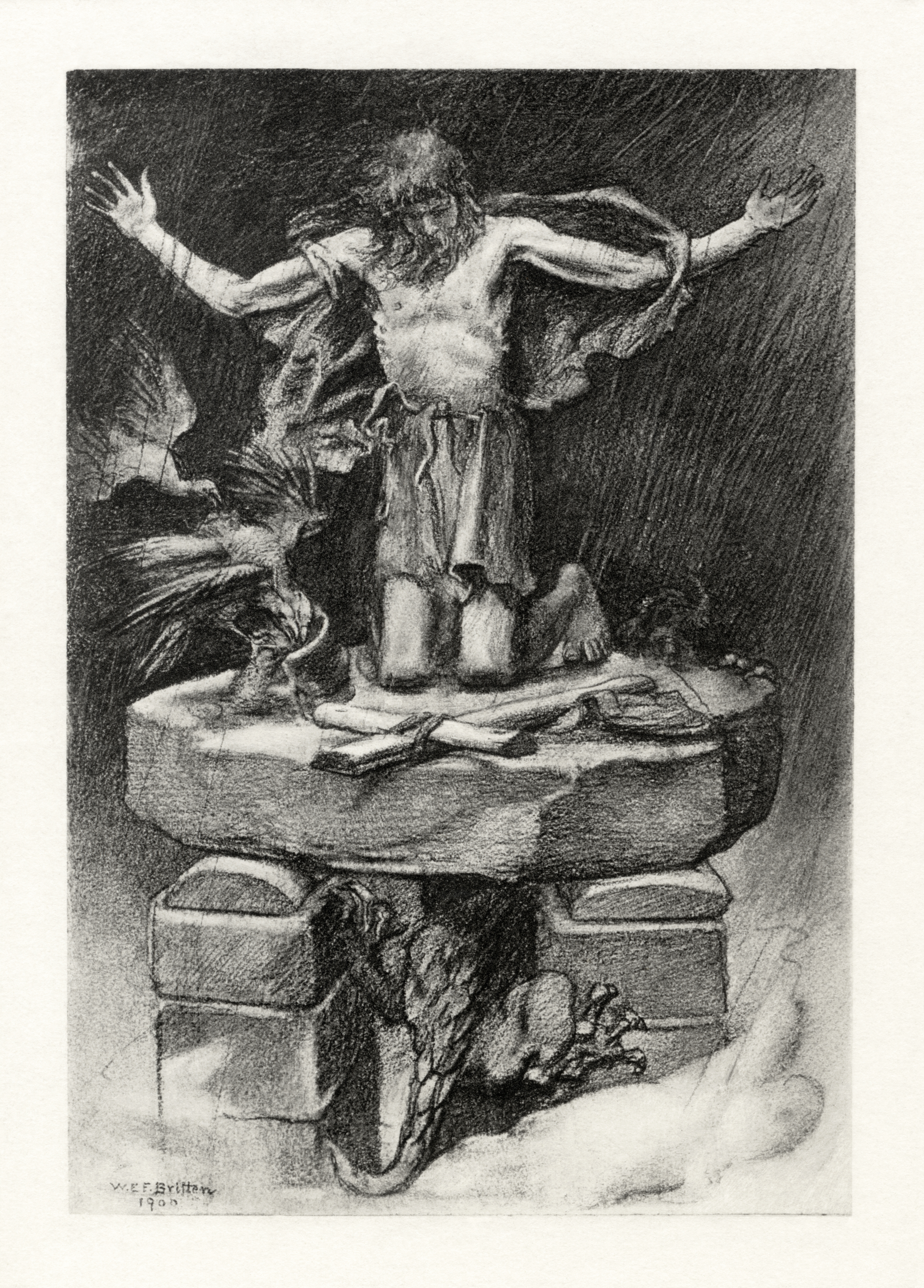
St. Simeon Stylites

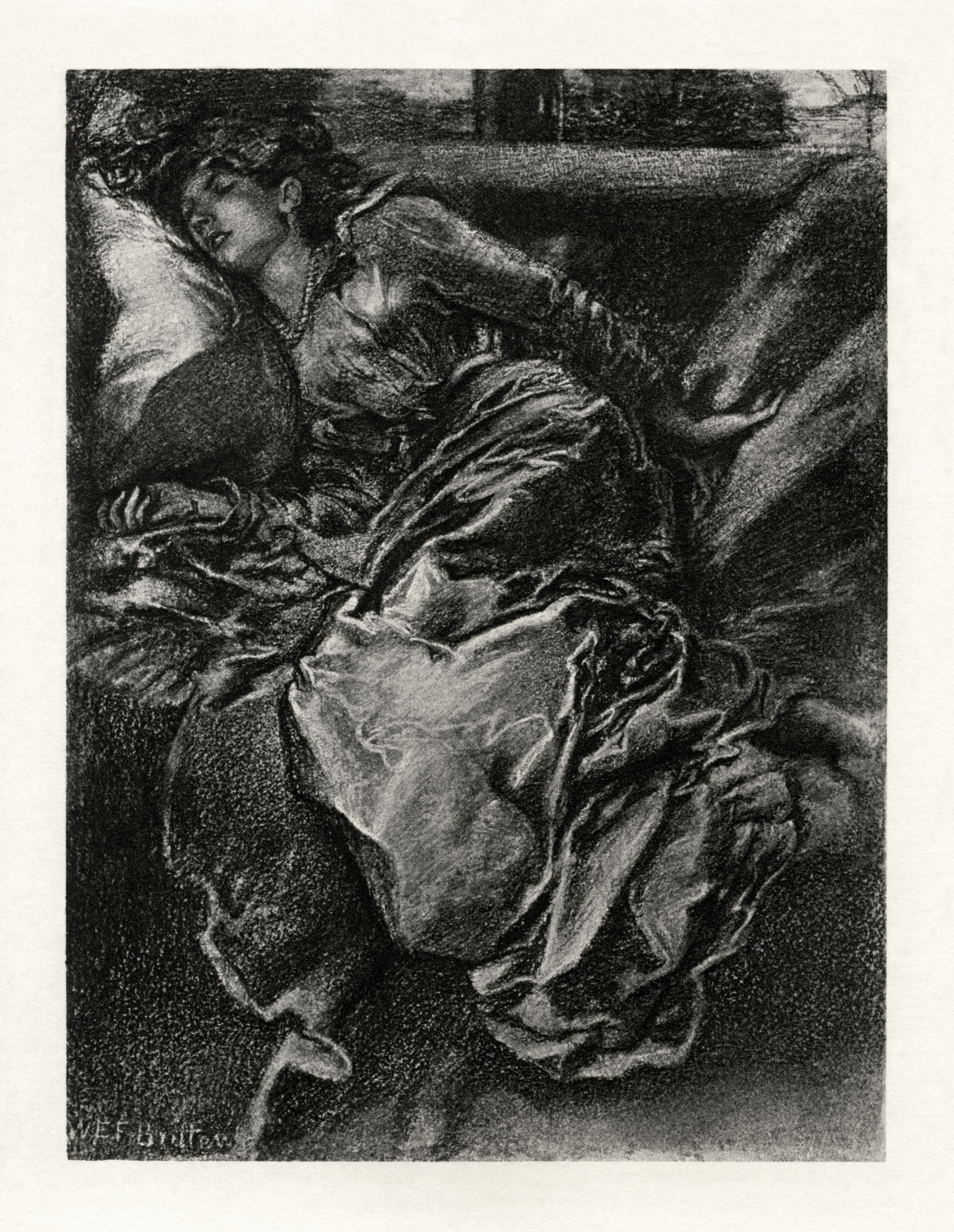
Sleeping Beauty

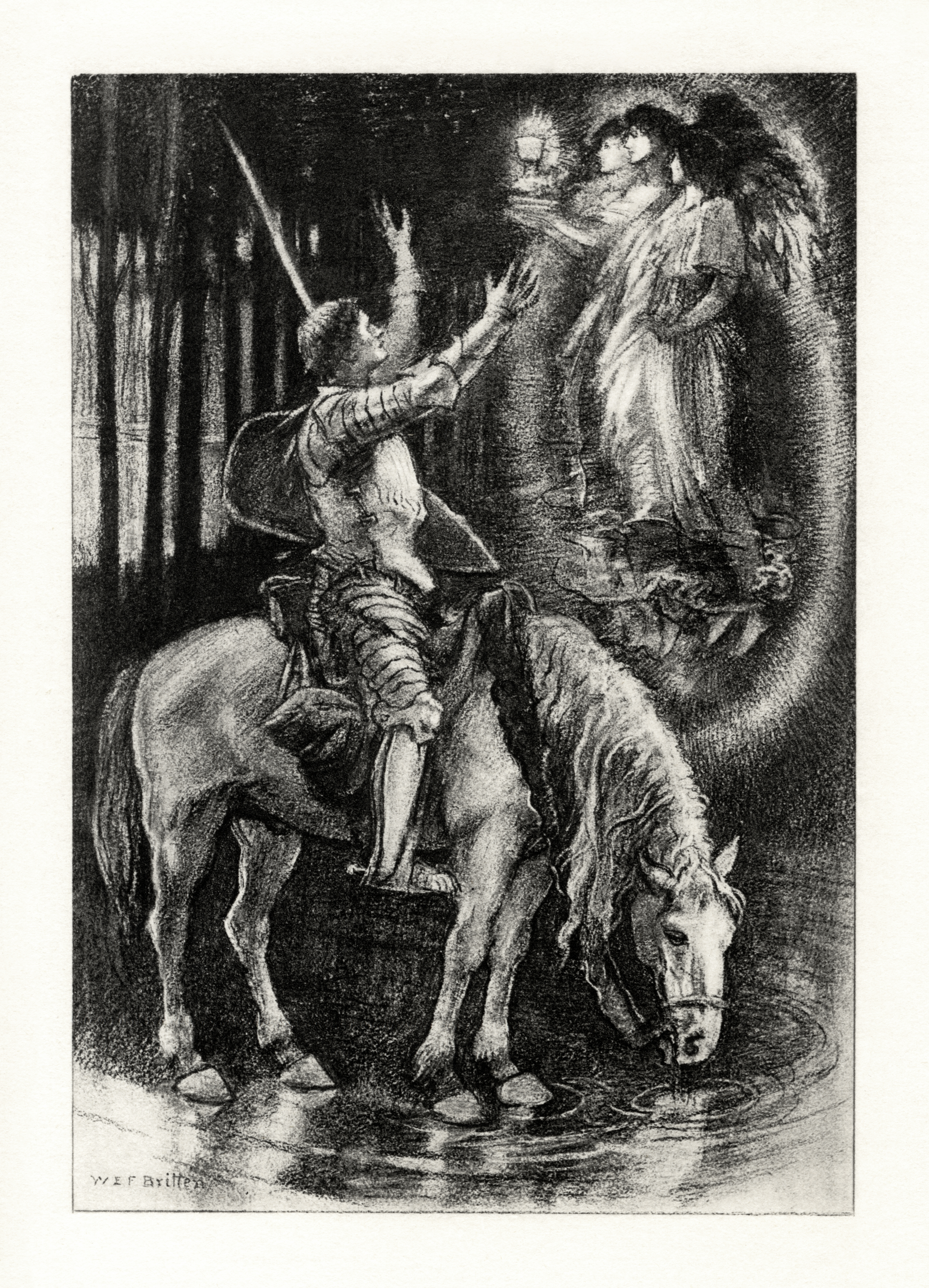
Sir Galahad

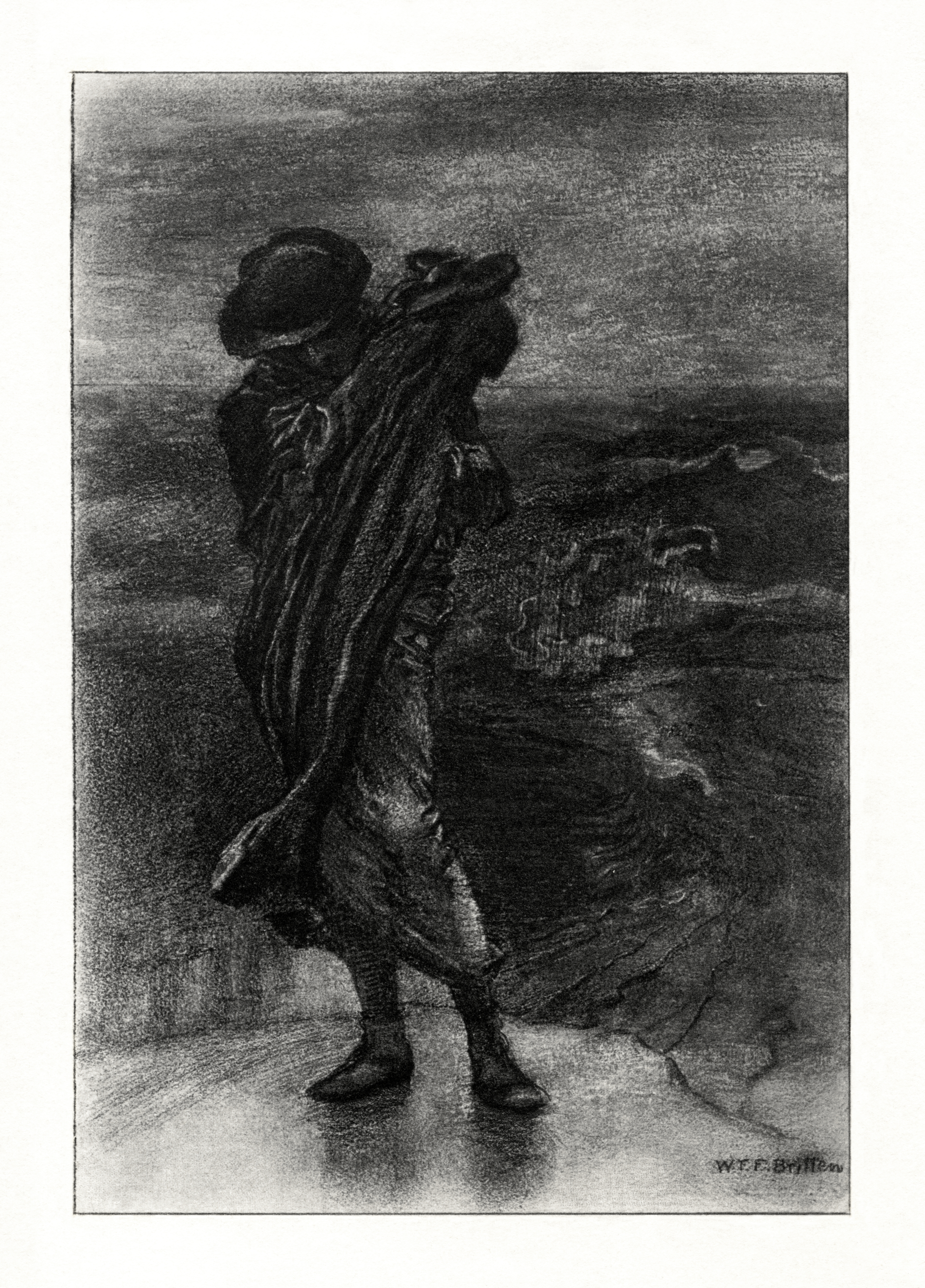
Break, Break, Break
