= Oenone (poem) =

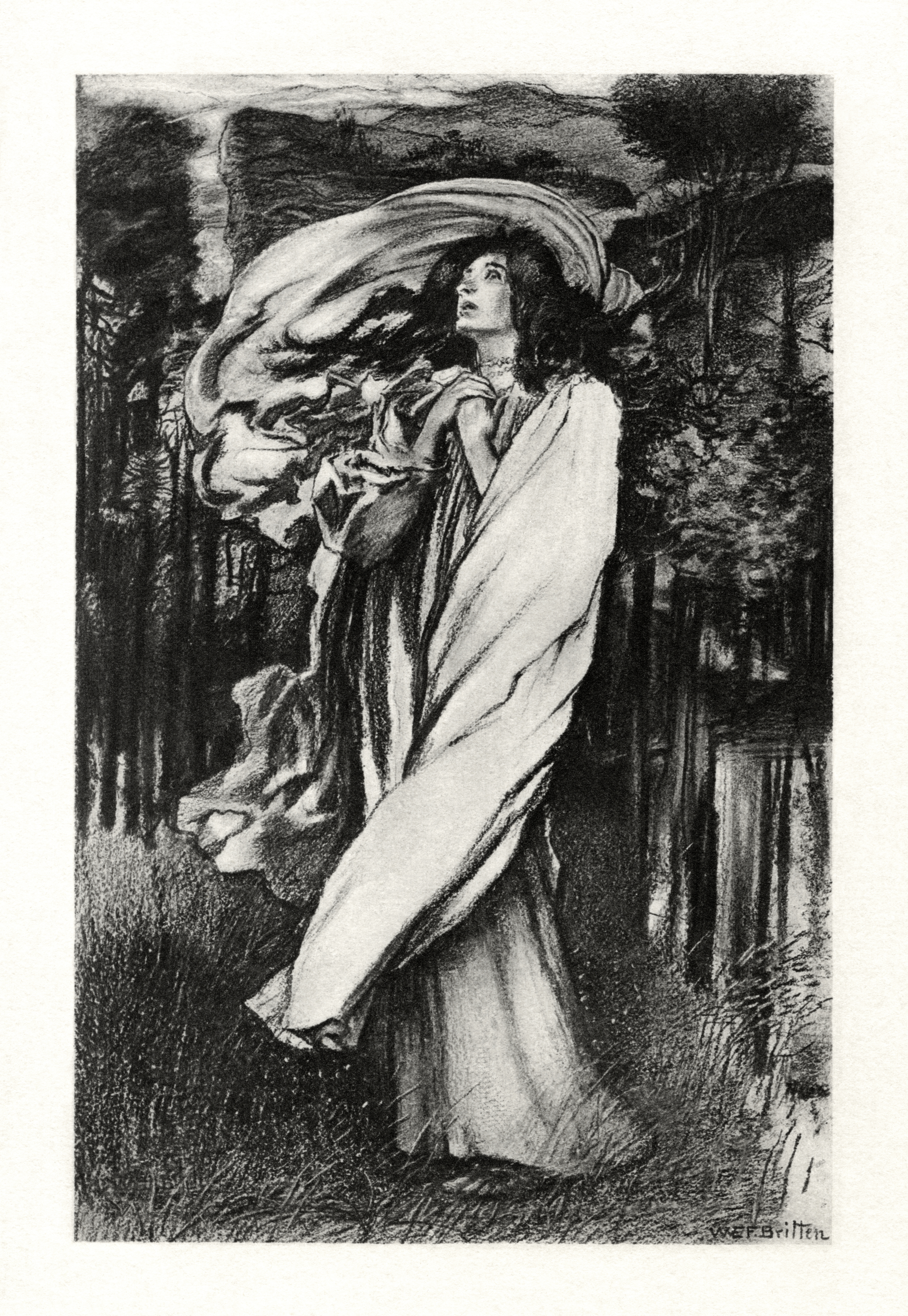
c. 1901 illustration to the poem by W. E. F. Britten

"Oenone" or "Œnone" is a poem written by Alfred Tennyson in 1829. The poem describes the Greek mythological character Oenone and her witnessing incidents in the life of her lover, Paris, as he is involved in the events of the Trojan War. "Oenone" was inspired by Tennyson's trip to Spain, where he visited the Pyrenees mountains. It is considered the simplest of Tennyson's dramatic monologues.

== Background ==
Tennyson became friends with Arthur Hallam while at Cambridge. During summer 1829, the two travelled to Spain to help a group of Spanish rebels in northern Spain. While there, Tennyson was able to experience the Pyrenees mountains, which influenced a few of his poems, including "Oenone", "The Lotos-Eaters" and "Mariana in the South". After meeting with the rebels, they travelled to Bordeaux and left for home on 8 September 1829. On that day, Tennyson read to a group of travellers on the boat his newly composed Oenone. Later in 1861, a return to the Spanish mountains and travelling the earlier path would inspire the poem "In the Valley of Cauteretz".

The poem was included in Tennyson's 1832 collection of poems. It was later revised for his 1842 collection of poems. As with other revised poems, Tennyson removed blends of words that he added to his early poems, with "goldensandalled" and "rosehued" as two examples from Oenon.

== Poem ==
The poem begins with a lament by Oenone. Although she describes her feelings, there is no one to hear her because her lover, Paris, is off to be with Helen:

Of Paris, once her playmate on the hills.
Her cheek had lost the rose, and round her neck
Floated her hair or seem'd to float in rest.
She, leaning on a fragment twined with vine,
Sang to the stillness, till the mountain-shade
Sloped downward to her seat from the upper cliff.
"O mother Ida, many-fountain'd Ida,
Dear mother Ida, harken ere I die.
For now the noonday quiet holds the hill:
The grasshopper is silent in the grass:
The lizard, with his shadow on the stone,
Rests like a shadow, and the winds are dead.
The purple flower droops: the golden bee
Is lily-cradled: I alone awake.
My eyes are full of tears, my heart of love,
My heart is breaking, and my eyes are dim,

Oenone is deeply in love with Paris, and she admits that when he is speaking she is unable to act. This is especially true when he reveals to her the Hesperian apple and when he becomes the judge of which goddess is allowed to have the apple as a gift:

He smiled, and opening out his milk-white palm
Disclosed a fruit of pure Hesperian gold,
That smelt ambrosially, and while I look'd
And listen'd, the full-flowing river of speech
Came down upon my heart.
"My own Œnone,
Beautiful-brow'd Œnone, my own soul,
Behold this fruit, whose gleaming rind ingrav'n
"For the most fair," would seem to award it thine,
As lovelier than whatever Oread haunt
The knolls of Ida, loveliest in all grace
Of movement, and the charm of married brows." (lines 64–75)

When Pallas offers her gifts to Paris, he refuses no matter how much Oenone wishes that he would have accepted:

but Pallas where she stood
Somewhat apart, her clear and bared limbs
O'erthwarted with the brazen-headed spear
Upon her pearly shoulder leaning cold,
The while, above, her full and earnest eye
Over her snow-cold breast and angry cheek
Kept watch, waiting decision, made reply.
"Self-reverence, self-knowledge, self-control,
These three alone lead life to sovereign power.
Yet not for power (power of herself
Would come uncall'd for) but to live by law,
Acting the law we live by without fear;
And, because right is right, to follow right
Were wisdom in the scorn of consequence.'
* * * * *
Here she ceas'd
And Paris ponder'd, and I cried, "O Paris,
Give it to Pallas!' but he heard me not,
Or hearing would not hear me, woe is me! (lines 136–149, 165–168)

Aphrodite, the love goddess, follows Pallas and offers a gift that competes against Oenone's role as Paris's wife. This causes Oenone to resort to emotionally appealing Paris:

Idalian Aphroditè beautiful,
Fresh as the foam, new-bathed in Paphian wells,
With rosy slender fingers backward drew
From her warm brows and bosom her deep hair
Ambrosial, golden round her lucid throat
And shoulder:
* * * * *
She with a subtle smile in her mild eyes,
The herald of her triumph, drawing nigh
Half-whisper'd in his ear, "I promise thee
The fairest and most loving wife in Greece."
She spoke and laugh'd: I shut my sight for fear:
* * * * *
Fairest—why fairest wife? am I not fair?
My love hath told me so a thousand times.
Methinks I must be fair, for yesterday,
When I past by, a wild and wanton pard,
Eyed like the evening star, with playful tail
Crouch'd fawning in the weed. Most loving is she?
Ah me, my mountain shepherd, that my arms
Were wound about thee, and my hot lips prest
Close, close to thine in that quick-falling dew
Of fruitful kisses, thick as Autumn rains
Flash in the pools of whirling Simois! (lines 171–176, 181–185, 193–203)

The poem concludes with Oenone describing contemporaneous events:

I will rise and go
Down into Troy, and ere the stars come forth
Talk with the wild Cassandra, for she says
A fire dances before her, and a sound
Rings ever in her ears of armed men.
What this may be I know not, but I know
That, wheresoe'er I am by night and day,
All earth and air seem only burning fire." (lines 258–266)

== Themes ==
Oenone is the simplest of Tennyson's dramatic monologues. Each of the monologues incorporates an ironic use of rhetoric by the manner in which an individual point of view is incrementally revealed within the poems. The character Oenone laments her fate and is portrayed as a victim to outside circumstances. However, her actions in letting her emotions control her is similar to the actions that Paris, her betrayer, committed; she, like him, is a victimiser to herself. Oenone is similar to other females in Tennyson's poems. In particular, she is a combination of the character Mariana, a quiet woman who suffers like a prisoner as she waits for her lover to return, and Fatima, who loses her mind and submits to her intense passions while losing herself in the material world.

The refrain, "Dear mother Ida, harken ere I die", reveals Oenone's imprisonment to both the situation she finds herself in and to her emotions. When Paris is offered "self-reverence, self-knowledge, self-control" by Pallas, Oenone cries out for him to accept the gifts above the others. When he refuses, she is dominated by her emotions in the same way Paris is dominated by his own. Instead, her actions are closer to those of Aphrodite, the goddess that Oenone competes against for Paris's affection. The jealousy and possessiveness of Oenone is similar to Tennyson's feelings at the time for Hallam's company, as Tennyson believed that he would be separated from his friend by a woman.

Oenone's song is similar to the events described in the poem. The city of Troy was created in song and ends with its eminent destruction. In a similar manner, Oenone's song comes from the destruction left by Paris. She also shifts from the Mariana-like prisoner type of character to the Fatima-like self-destructive character as the poem progresses. Changes between the 1832 and 1842 edition of the poems reflect changes in Tennyson's role as the poet creating a song and, thus, his similarity to Oenone as a character.

== Critical response ==
Tennyson's 1832 collection of poems was savaged by John Wilson Croker in a Quarterly Review article of April 1833. The review was based on a close reading of the various poems followed by attacks on the content. Of the various poems attacked, "Oenone" was the truest hit, as Croker focused on how the poem was filled with unclear descriptions.
