= St. Simeon Stylites (poem) =

1833 poem by Alfred Tennyson

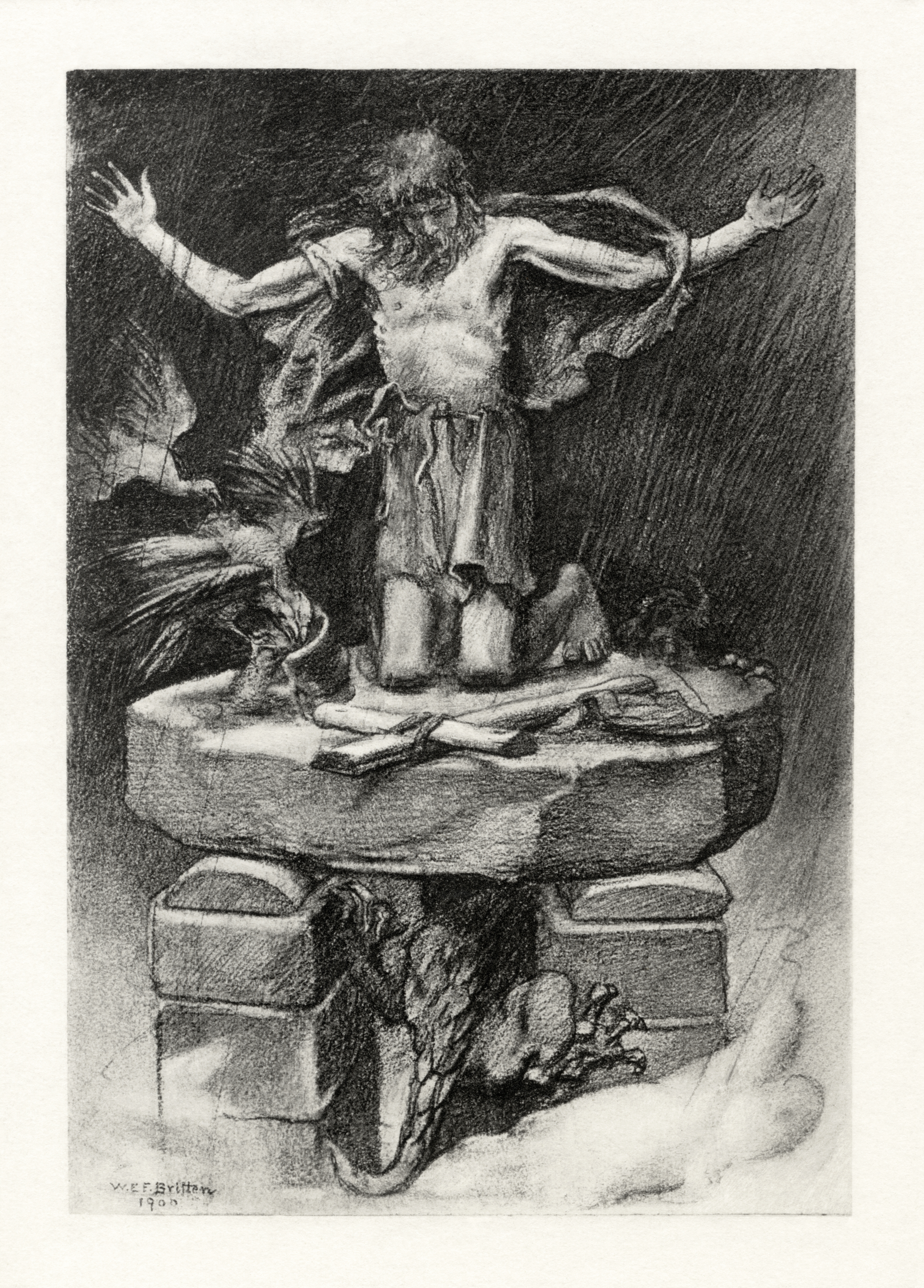
Image by W. E. F. Britten, for a 1901 scholarly edition of Tennyson's early works.

"St Simeon Stylites" is a poem written by Alfred Tennyson in 1833 and published in his 1842 collection of poetry. The poem describes the actions of St. Simeon Stylites, a Christian ascetic saint who recounts his various physical acts in hopes that he has earned his place in heaven. It captures Tennyson's feelings following the death of a close friend, Arthur Hallam, and contains feelings of self-loathing and regret. The work has ironic overtones that give it the appearance of a satirical work.

== Background ==
In 1833, Tennyson's close friend Arthur Hallam died. He was deeply affected by this death and many of his poems written soon after contained feelings of self-loathing and regret, including "St. Simeon Stylites". The poem also contained a satirical response to religious asceticism in general, which is possibly related to his feelings about his aunt Mary Bourne and her Calvinistic views. "St. Simeon Stylites" was completed by autumn 1833 and was circulated among Tennyson's fellows at Cambridge University.

The poem was later published in his 1842 collection of poetry. The poem's combination of dark humour, imagery and sympathy for the hero was unique in relationship to the previous works Tennyson published before 1842. Tennyson, at the end of his life in 1892, returned to the idea and followed "St. Simeon Stylites" with the poem "St. Telemachus".

== Poem ==
Within the poem, St. Simeon describes himself in excess:

Let this avail, just, dreadful, mighty God,
This not be all in vain, that thrice ten years,
Thrice multiplied by superhuman pangs,
In hungers and in thirsts, fevers and cold,
In coughs, aches, stitches, ulcerous throes and cramps,
A sign betwixt the meadow and the cloud,
Patient on this tall pillar I have borne
Rain, wind, frost, heat, hail, damp, and sleet, and snow; (lines 9–16)

St. Simeon, with all that he does, still doubts his salvation. While he believes that experiencing pain can be beneficial, he questions if there will be any benefit from his actions:

O Jesus, if thou wilt not save my soul,
Who may be saved? who is it may be saved?
Who may be made a saint, if I fail here?
Show me the man hath suffered more than I.
For did not all thy martyrs die one death?
For either they were stoned, or crucified,
Or burned in fire, or boiled in oil, or sawn
In twain beneath the ribs; but I die here
Today, and whole years long, a life of death. (lines 45–53)

As the poem progresses, he reveals that he depends on the number of his actions to verify his deeds:

Then, that I might be more alone with thee,
Three years I lived upon a pillar, high
Six cubits, and three years on one of twelve;
And twice three years I crouched on one that rose
Twenty by measure; last of all, I grew
Twice ten long weary weary years to this,
That numbers forty cubits from the soil. (lines 84–90)

Near the poem's end, St. Simeon is filled with confidence that he will experience paradise, but this is followed by doubt that it is only a trick:

A flash of light. Is that the angel there
That holds a crown? Come, blessed brother, come.
I know thy glittering face. I waited long;
My brows are ready. What! deny it now?
Nay, draw, draw, draw nigh. So I clutch it. Christ!
'Tis gone: 'tis here again; the crown! the crown!
So now 'tis fitted on and grows to me,
And from it melt the dews of Paradise,
Sweet! sweet! spikenard, and balm, and frankincense.
Ah! let me not be fooled, sweet saints: I trust
That I am whole, and clean, and meet for Heaven. (lines 200–210)

The poem concludes with St. Simeon returning to his counting, which is followed by him asking that the reader follows his pattern:

I prophesy that I shall die tonight,
A quarter before twelve. But thou, O Lord,
Aid all this foolish people; let them take
Example, pattern: lead them to thy light. (lines 217–220)

== Themes ==
"St. Simeon Stylites" is related to other post-Hallam works like Ulysses as it captures Tennyson's feelings after his friend's death. Later, in In Memoriam, Tennyson would describe his feelings in a broad manner. The work has ironic overtones that make it appear as a satirical work. As a whole, the work parodies Christianity that emphasises the egotistical self while also serving as a lamentation of the self. The character of St Simeon is portrayed in a manner that he is comical and disgusting while also being sympathetic. He is also simultaneously an abnormal individual and a normal individual that captures the extremes of human personality while also exhibiting moderate characteristics. At the end of the poem, St Simeon asks that the reader follows his example. His example is one the reader would reject, but it is also one that the reader would recognise as the basic pattern of humanity.

Tennyson discusses consciousness and personality in "St. Simeon Stylites". The humour within the poem is not a primary focus in a similar way as Will Waterproof's Lyrical Monologue. Although the poem is very different from the works before 1842, it has some relationship with The Two Voices. The humour and irony is the result of St Simeon trying to deal with his internal self by dealing with his external self. Although he hates his body, his body becomes his representation for being spiritually correct. St. Simeon focuses on the material world, and even religious songs are important only for their sound and not their truth. Even in thinking about his death, he can only think of how his body will be treated. This is surrounded by the poem describing St. Simeon's physical condition in a humorous manner, such as his lack of teeth or him being an old man, instead of being described as a saint.

In relationship of the style of "St. Simeon Stylites" with the rest of Tennyson's works, James Kincaid declare: "Critics often express astonishment that the same mind could produce both 'St. Simeon Stylites' and 'The May Queen'". As a dramatic monologue, the poem is similar to The Lotos-Eaters, Rizpah and Ulysses, and it is similar to the dramatic monologues of Robert Browning. In terms of the poem's use of irony, it is similar to the "Northern Farmer" poems. In use of a figure that serves as an auditor of the poem, "St. Simeon Stylites" is similar to "Columbus", "Despair", "Tiresias", Ulysses and other poems. In the particular use in "St Simeon Stylites", the auditor is in place to determine who Simeon is directing his conversation to: God or St. Simeon.

== Critical response ==
In response to the 1842 collection of poems, Tennyson's friend James Spedding wrote a review that focused on "The Palace of Art", "St. Simeon Stylites", The Two Voices and The Vision of Sin as good works. Leigh Hunt, in a review for the October 1842 Church and England Quarterly Review, said that the work was an "appalling satire on the pseudo-aspirations of egotistical asceticism and superstition".
