= Guildford =

Town in Surrey, England

Coordinates: 51°14′11″N 0°34′13″W

- Town
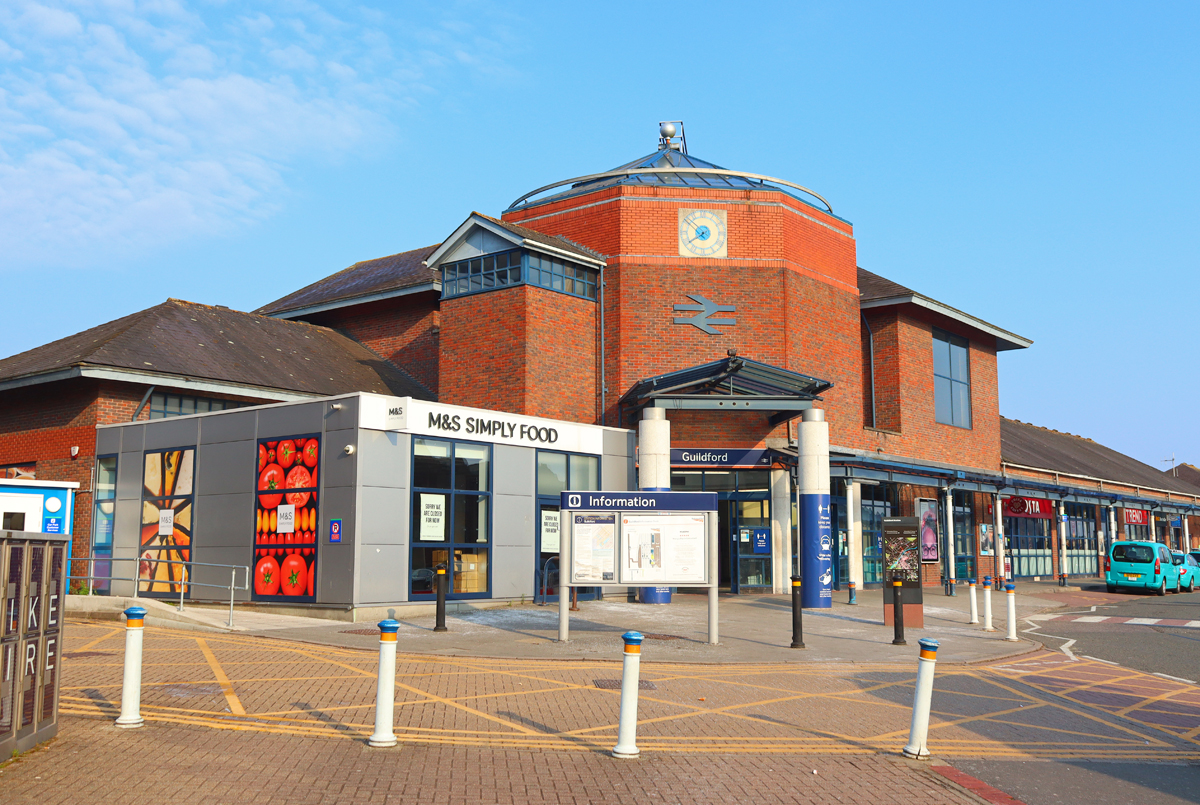
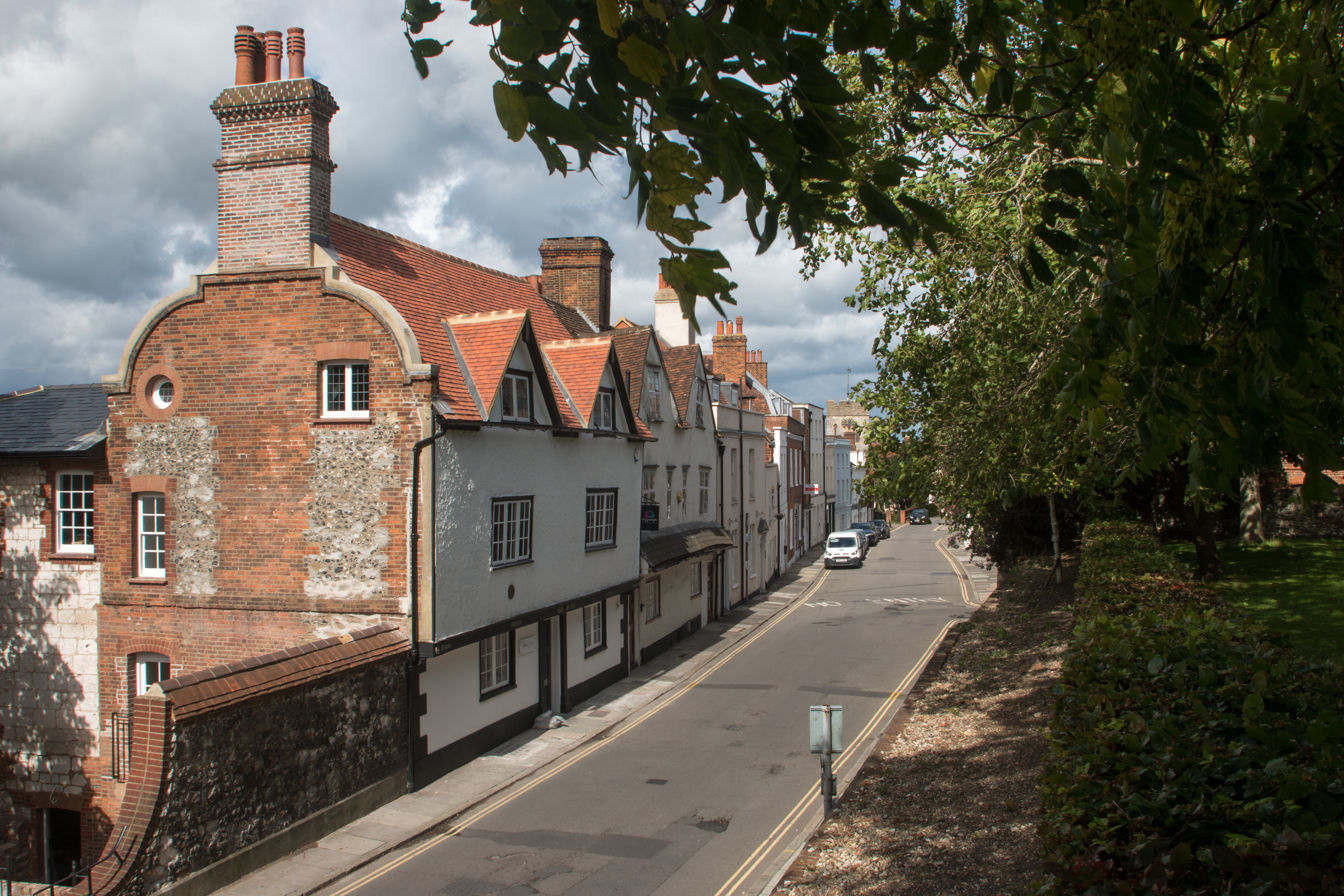
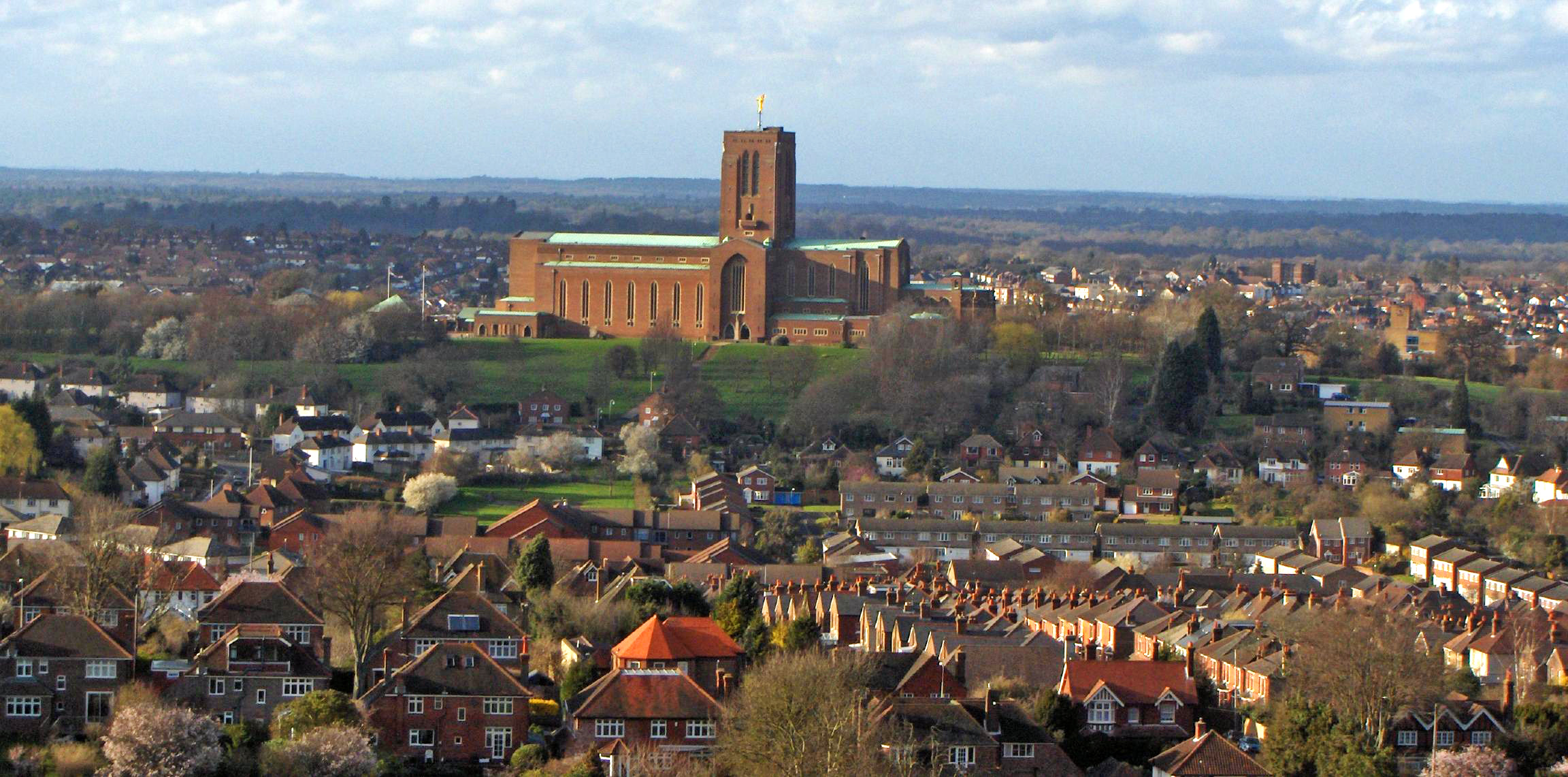
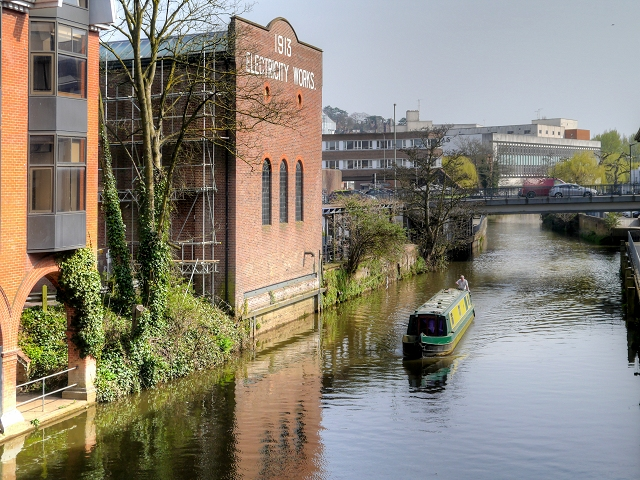
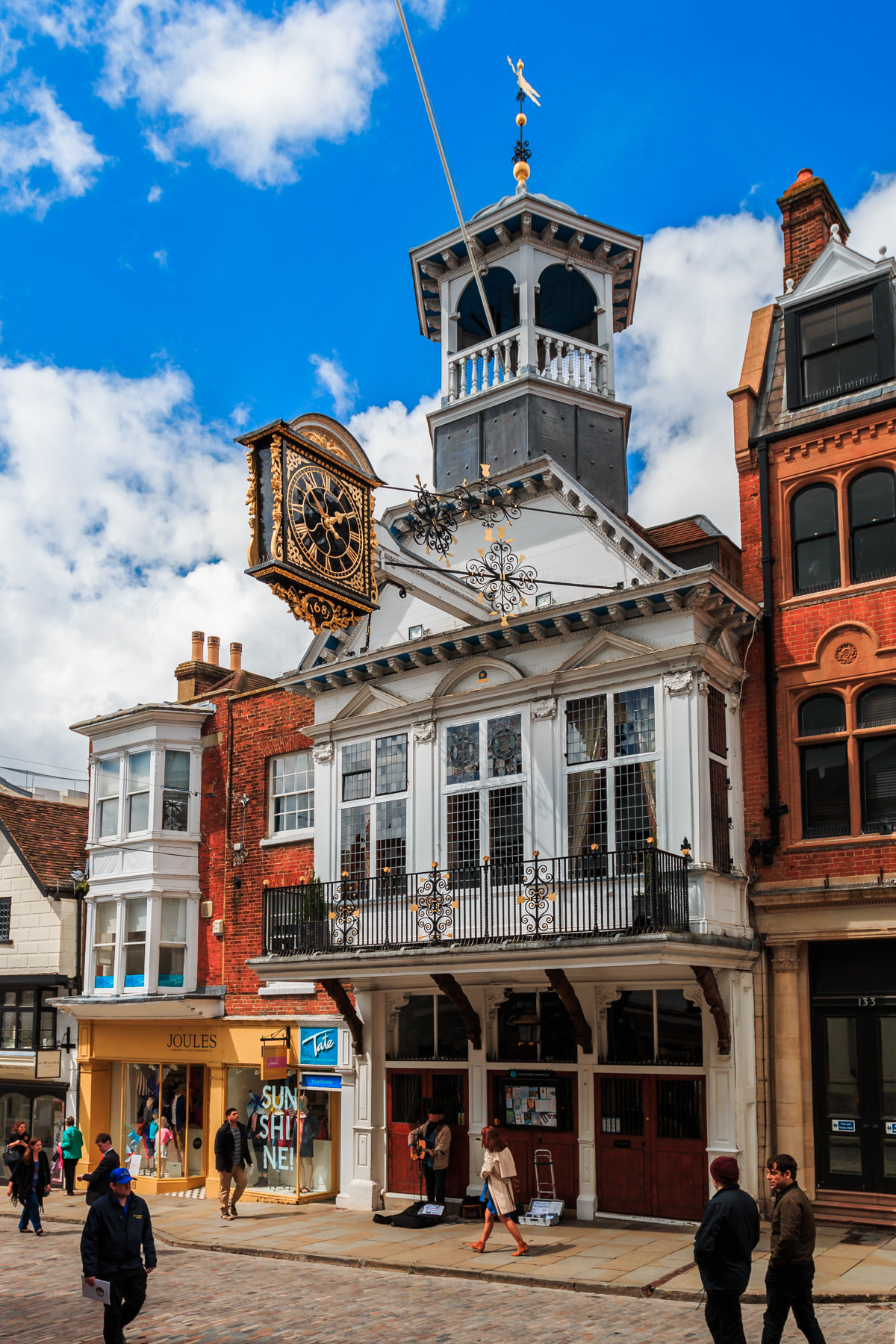
- Clockwise from top left: Guildford railway station; Quarry Street; Guildford Cathedral with residential housing in the foreground; the Guildhall; and the Electric Theatre by the River Wey

- Location within Surrey
- Population: 77,057 (2011)
- OS grid reference: SU9949
  - London: 27.5 miles (44.3 km) NE
- District: Guildford
- Shire county: Surrey
- Region: South East
- Country: England
- Sovereign state: United Kingdom
- Post town: Guildford
- Postcode district: GU1-4
- Dialling code: 01483
- Police: Surrey
- Fire: Surrey
- Ambulance: South East Coast
- UK Parliament: Guildford

Guildford (/ˈɡɪlfərd/) is a town in west Surrey, England, around 27 mi (43 km) southwest of central London. As of the 2011 census, the town had a population of about 77,000; it is the seat of the wider Borough of Guildford, which had around 152,148 inhabitants in 2025. Its name is thought to derive from a crossing of the River Wey, a tributary of the River Thames, that flows through the town centre.

The earliest evidence of human activity in the area is from the Mesolithic and Guildford is mentioned in the will of Alfred the Great from c. 880. The exact location of the main Anglo-Saxon settlement is unclear and the current site of the modern town centre may not have been occupied until the early 11th century. Following the Norman Conquest, a motte-and-bailey castle was constructed; which was developed into a royal residence by Henry III. During the late Middle Ages, Guildford prospered as a result of the wool trade and the town was granted a charter of incorporation by Henry VII in 1488.

The River Wey Navigation between Guildford and the Thames was opened in 1653, facilitating the transport of produce, building materials and manufactured items to new markets in London. The arrival of the railways in the 1840s attracted further investment and the town began to grow with the construction of its first new suburb at Charlotteville in the 1860s. The town became the centre of a new Anglican diocese in 1927 and the foundation stone of the cathedral was laid in 1936. Guildford became a university town in September 1966, when the University of Surrey was established by Royal Charter.

Guildford is surrounded on three sides by the Surrey Hills National Landscape, which severely limits its potential for expansion to the east, west and south. Recent development has been focused to the north of the town in the direction of Woking. Guildford now officially forms the southwestern tip of the Greater London Built-up Area, as defined by the Office for National Statistics.

== Toponymy ==
The oldest surviving record of Guildford is from a c. 1000 copy of the c. 880 – c. 885 will of Alfred the Great, in which the settlement appears as Gyldeforda. The name is written as Gildeford in Domesday Book and later as Gyldeford (c. 1130), Guldeford (c. 1186 – c. 1198) and Guildeford (1226). The first part of the name is thought to derive from the Old English gylde, meaning gold, possibly referring to the colour of the sand to the south of the town, or to a local concentration of yellow flowers such as the common or marsh marigold. (Note: The 19th century publisher, Samuel Lewis, suggested in A Topographical Dictionary of England (1848), that the first part of the name refers to a guild. Several 20th and 21st century writers consider this derivation unlikely, as it is not consistent with current theories of phonology. Another alternative suggestion is that an early name for the River Wey was the Gil or Guilon.) The second part of the name (‑ford) refers to a crossing of the River Wey.

== History ==
=== Early history ===
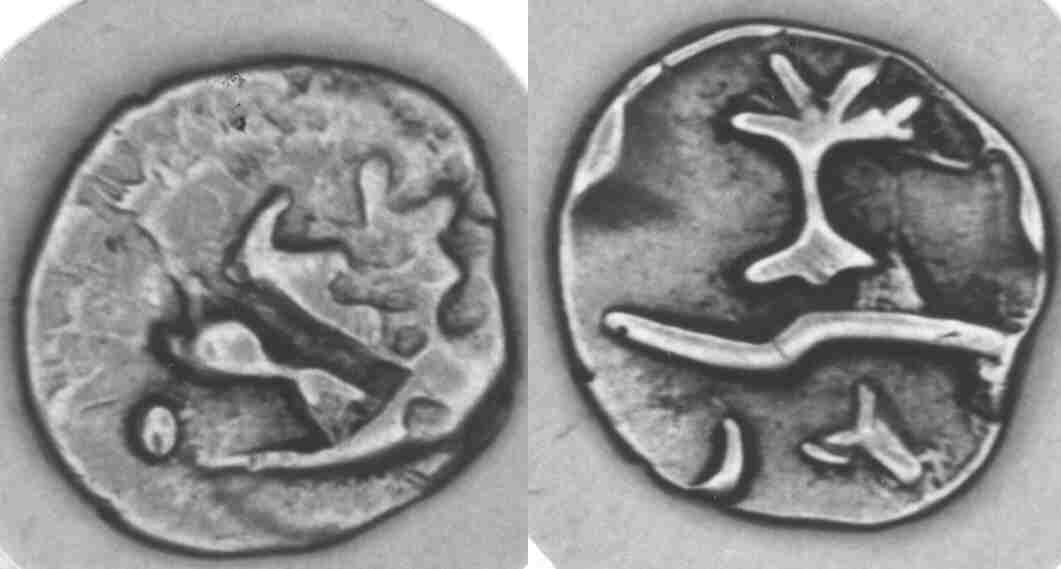
An Iron Age gold quarter stater coin, found in Guildford in 1974

The earliest evidence of human activity in the Guildford area is from St Catherine's Hill, where Mesolithic flint tools have been found. There may also have been Bronze Age and Iron Age settlements on the hill. The areas now occupied by Christ's College and Manor Farm were farmed in the Bronze Age, Iron Age and Roman period. Traces of a 2nd-century villa were discovered at Broadstreet Common during an excavation in 1998.

=== Anglo-Saxon period ===
There is thought to have been an Anglo-Saxon settlement in the Guildford area by the early 6th century, although its precise location is unclear. Excavations in the 1930s revealed a Saxon cemetery at Guildown at the east end of the Hog's Back. Burials took place at the site up to the mid-11th century, but the oldest skeletons were buried in the late 6th century. (Note: Thirty of the oldest skeletons excavated from Guildown were found with grave goods, including brooches, rings and knives. The presence of these objects suggests that these were pagan burials. Fragments of cinerary urns of the same period indicate that cremation burials also took place at the site.)

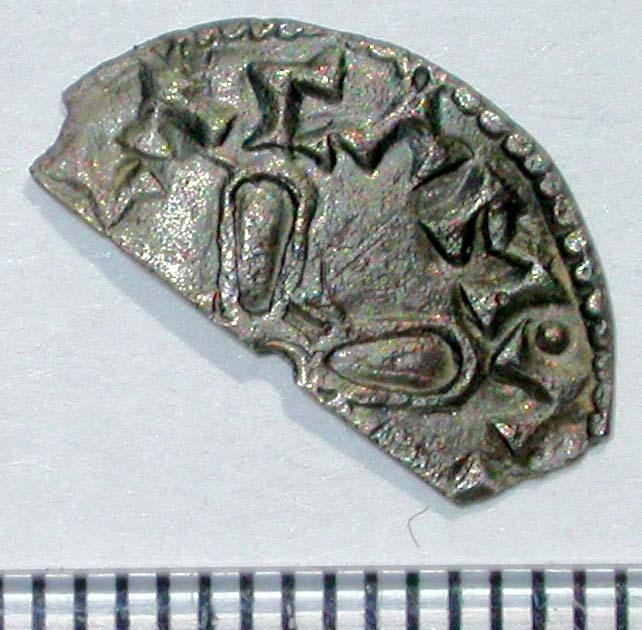
A cut halfpenny of King Harthacnut, minted at Guildford in 1036 or 1037

The first written record of Guildford is from the will of Alfred the Great, dated to around 880, in which the settlement was left to his nephew, Aethelwold. Although it does not appear in the Burghal Hidage, compiled c. 914, (Note: In contrast, the burh at Eashing (around 7 km (4.3 mi) southwest of Guildford) is recorded in the Burghal Hidage. The fortified site, on a low sandstone hill overlooking the River Wey, is thought to have been in use c. 880 – c. 930. The decline of the Eashing burh may be linked to the increasing importance of Guildford as a regional centre in the mid-9th century.) by the end of the 10th century the town was sufficiently important to be the location of a Royal Mint. Coins were struck at Guildford from 978 until at least 1099. (Note: Around 80 silver pennies minted in Guildford between 978 and 1099, are known to be in existence today. Southwark was the only other Surrey town with a Royal Mint during the Saxon period and a greater quantity of coinage was produced there than at Guildford.)

Around 220 of the skeletons excavated at Guildown are thought to be the remains of soldiers massacred during the arrest of Alfred Aetheling in 1035 or 1036. Contemporary accounts are somewhat contradictory, but the modern consensus is that Aetheling, a pretender to the throne and the brother of Edward the Confessor, was travelling through Guildford with a large bodyguard when the incident occurred. (Note: One close contemporary source states that Aetheling was travelling to Winchester to visit his mother, Emma of Normandy. Another states that he was en route to London for a meeting with the King, Harold Harefoot.) Aetheling was arrested by Godwin, Earl of Wessex and his men were killed. Many of the skeletons showed evidence of a violent death and the skulls of two were between their legs, suggesting that they had been executed by decapitation. Aetheling was taken to Ely, where he was blinded, and he is thought to have died there in February 1036.

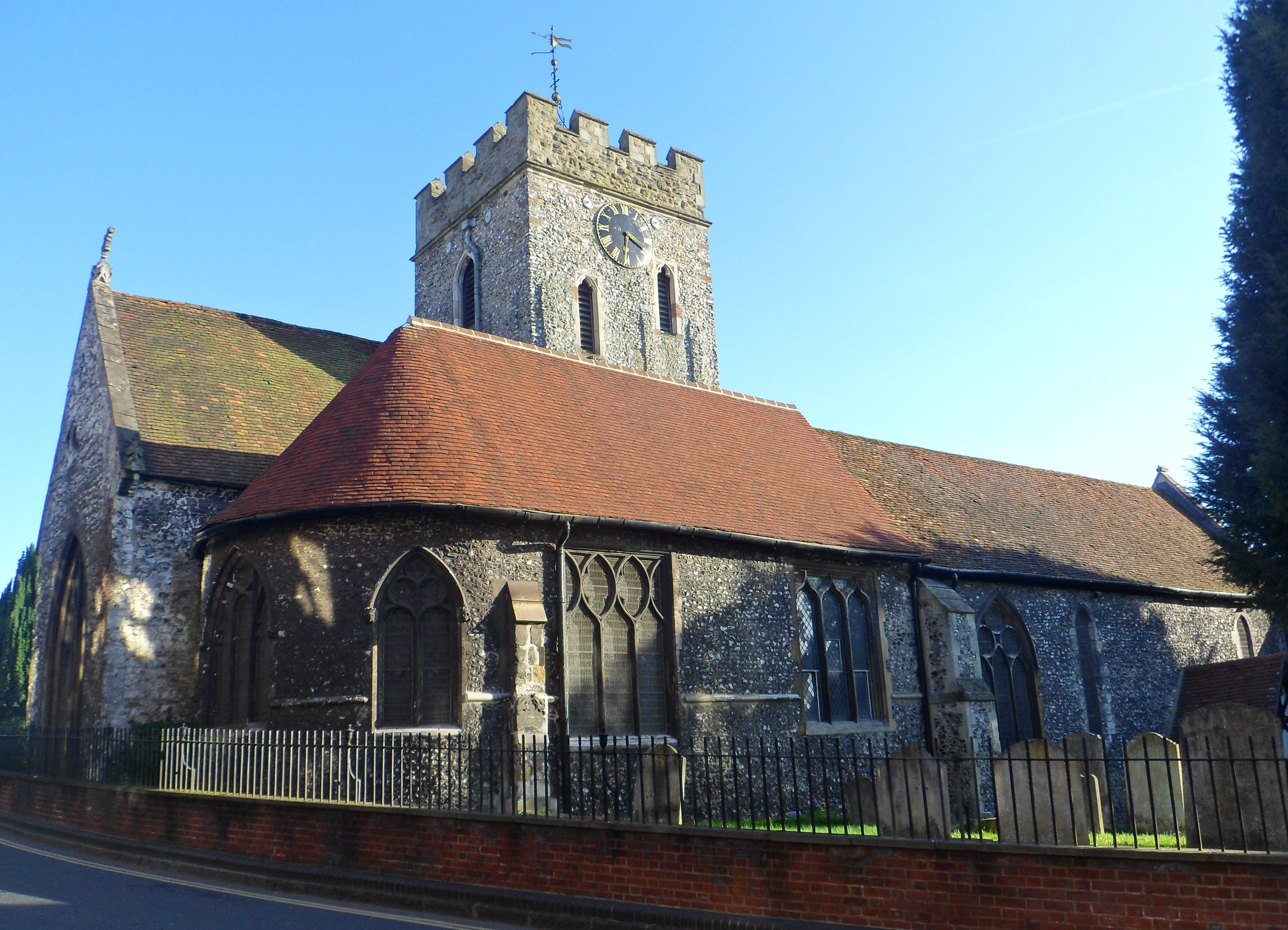
St Mary's Church, Quarry Street

The oldest extant building in Guildford is St Mary's Church, the tower of which was built c. 1040. Its location, on Quarry Street, may indicate that, at the time of its construction, the High Street had either not been laid out or was not the principal road. There is no significant archaeological evidence of human activity in the modern town centre before the 11th century and it is possible that, for the majority of the Saxon period, Stoke next Guildford, to the north, was the primary area of settlement. (Note: The predecessor church to St John the Evangelist at Stoke next Guildford may have been a minster.)

=== Governance ===
In Domesday Book of 1086, Guildford appears as Gildeford and is divided into seven parts, all of which were the property of William I. Two of the areas were held by reeves and four were held by lesser tenants, one of whom was Ranulf Flambard. The land directly controlled by the king included 175 homagers (heads of household), who lived in 75 hagae. (Note: The term haga (plural hagae) is generally understood to mean an area of land, surrounded by fences or hedges, and containing one or more dwellings. It is sometimes translated as a "close of houses".) Flambard's holding included three hagae that accommodated six homagers and, in total, the town provided an annual income of £30 for the king. William I is also listed as holding Stoke-by-Guildford, which had a population of 24 villagers, ten smallholders and five slaves. The manor had sufficient land for 22 plough teams, 16 acres of meadow, woodland for 40 swine and two mills.

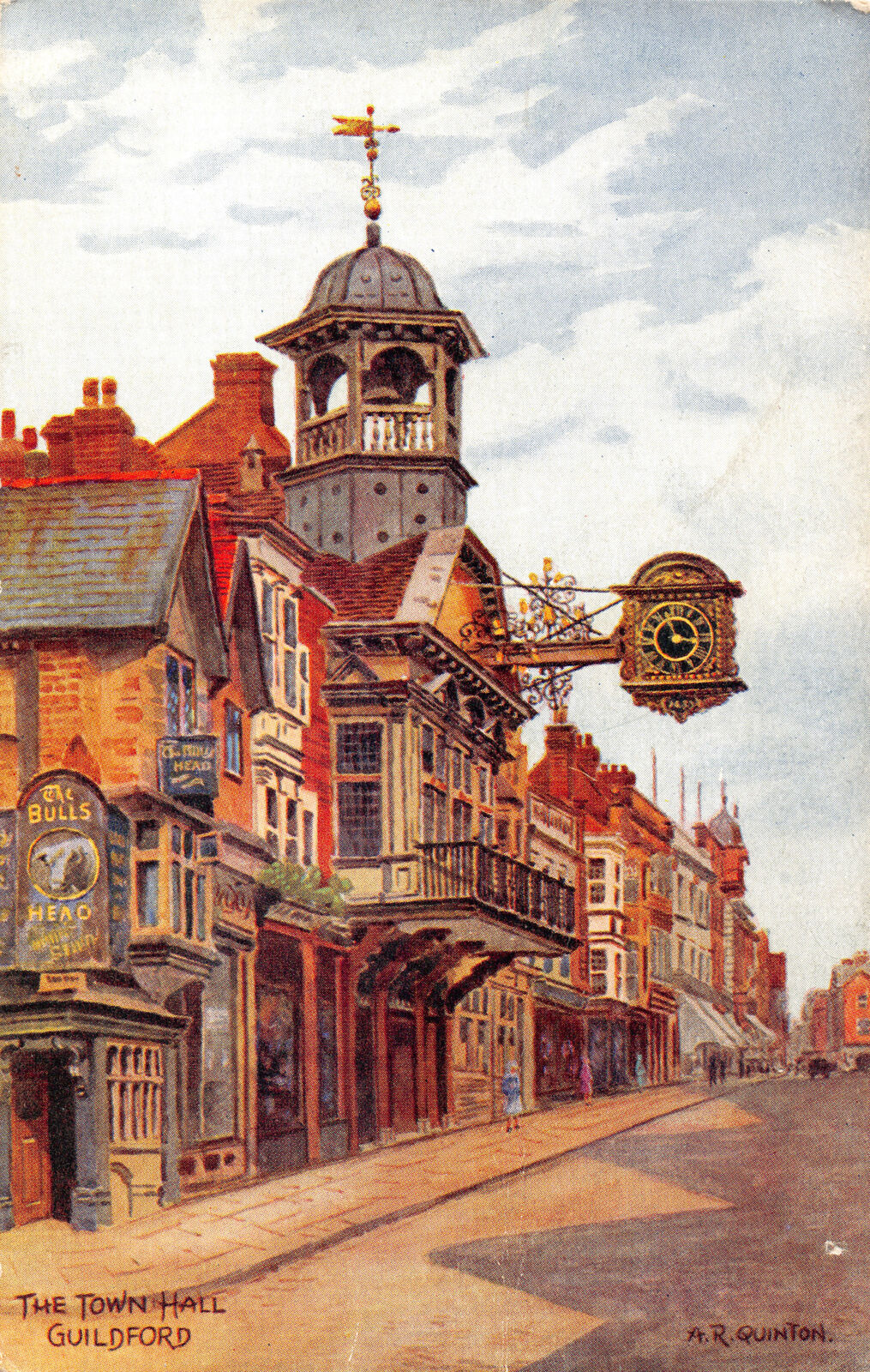
Town Hall Guildford (postcard 1915) by A. R. Quinton

Guildford remained a property of the Crown throughout the Middle Ages and several kings, including Henry II and John are known to have visited regularly. Henry III granted the town its first borough charter in January 1257, which permitted it to send two representatives to parliament. In August of the same year, he designated Guildford as the location of the Surrey County Court and Assizes. In 1366, Edward III issued a fee farm grant, enabling the town to become partially self-governing in exchange for a yearly rent of £10. Henry VII was responsible for granting Guildford its coat of arms in 1485 and, three years later, he awarded the charter of incorporation, which placed the administration of the borough in the hands of a mayor and burgesses, appointed from the merchants' guild.

The modern system of local government began to emerge in the 1830s. Under the Municipal Corporations Act 1835, a democratically elected council replaced the mayor and burgesses, and the borough expanded beyond the medieval town boundaries. A year later, the Guildford Poor Law Union was formed, with responsibility for a total area of 12 sq mi (31 km^{2}) stretching from Godalming to Woking. As a result of the Local Government Act 1888, several responsibilities were transferred from the borough to the newly formed Surrey County Council. The borough boundaries were extended again in both 1904 and 1933. (Note: Merrow was included in the borough for the first time in 1933.) The final enlargement took place in March 1974, when the present local authority was created from the merger of the borough with the Guildford Rural District.

=== Guildford Castle ===
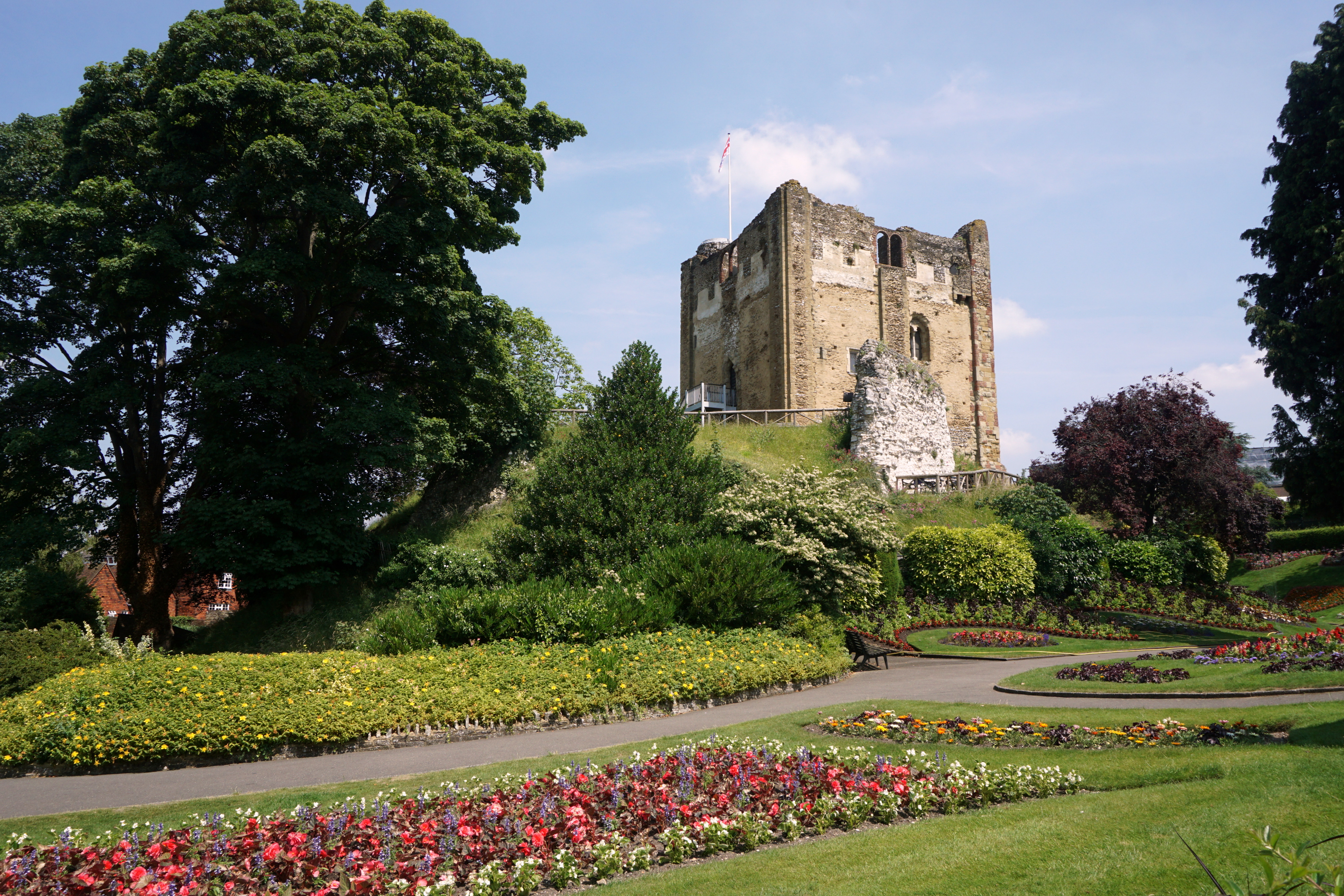
Guildford Castle

Guildford Castle is to the south of the modern town centre. Although it is not explicitly mentioned in Domesday Book, it is possible that it was included in one of the areas of land held by Ranulf Flambard. The date of its original construction is uncertain, but the consensus among historians is that it was built as a motte-and-bailey castle soon after the Norman Conquest. (Note: The earliest surviving written reference to Guildford Castle is in the pipe rolls of 1173-74.) A polygonal stone shell keep was built in chalk and flint rubblestone around the top of the motte in the early 12th Century, the remains of which are still visible.

The square keep, known as the Great Tower, was constructed in the mid-12th century from Bargate stone. Originally built with only two floors, it was a "solar keep" and functioned primarily as a private residence, rather than as an administrative centre. At an unknown later date, a third storey was built directly on top of the crenelations, to bring the structure to its present height. Part of the keep was in use as a prison by the end of the 12th century and new, royal apartments were constructed in the 13th century in the southwestern corner. Henry III commissioned the rebuilding of the castle following a fire in the mid-13th century, converting it into one of the most luxurious palaces in England. In 1245, he bought land to extend the castle grounds and Castle Arch was constructed on his orders in 1256.

The castle ceased to be a royal residence in the Tudor period and it was leased from the Crown by Francis Carter in the reign of James I. A Parliamentary survey in 1650 noted that the keep was still habitable, although the associated outbuildings are thought to have been ruinous by this time. In 1885, the borough purchased the castle grounds and opened them to the public three years later.

=== Guildford Friary ===
The Guildford Black Friary was a community of Dominicans, founded by Eleanor of Provence, wife of Henry III, around 1275. (Note: The exact date of the foundation of the Black Friary is unknown, but it could not have taken place before 1236, the year of Eleanor's marriage to Henry III. There is no mention of the friars being among those who prayed for the soul of her grandson, Prince Henry, who died in 1274 and it is possible that Eleanor founded the friary in his memory. Historical documents note that Henry's heart was "lodged at the Guildford Priory" and Eleanor is acknowledged as the "first fundryse". The earliest surviving record of the community is from 1275, when Edward I granted an enlargement of the friary grounds.) (Note: The first known religious community in Guildford was the order of the Friars de Ordine Martyrum, which is recorded in 1260. The order was disbanded by the Second Council of Lyon in 1274 and it is possible that Eleanor incorporated parts of this earlier community into her foundation.) It occupied a site of around 10 acres (4.0 ha) beside the River Wey, to the north of the Town Ditch (now North Street). Excavations in the 1970s revealed that the original buildings were arranged around three sides of a central cloister, with a church to the south, chapter house to the east and kitchen to the north. (Note: Excavations in the 1970s, identified 65 separate graves in the friary precinct of which 28 were in the nave of the church. Several contained multiple burials and it has been suggested that these graves were for victims of the plague.) The community was never large; in 1336 there were only 20 friars and by the time of its dissolution in 1537, there were only seven. In the late Tudor period, the building was occasionally used as a royal residence until 1606, when it was demolished and the materials used for construction projects elsewhere in the town.

In 1630, John Annandale purchased the friary grounds and built a house there. The property passed through a series of private owners until 1794, when it was bought by the War Office. It was used as a barracks until the end of the Napoleonic Wars and then demolished in 1818. The grounds are indicated on an 1841 map of Guildford as the "Barrack Field" and shortly afterwards the area was divided into plots and sold for housebuilding. In 1858, the Chennel family set up a steam-powered flour mill on the site of the friary church and cloisters, which was subsequently purchased and converted to a brewery by Thomas Taunton in the 1870s. In 1956, the brewery merged with the Meux Brewery of Nine Elms to form Friary Meux. The combined company was taken over by Allied Breweries in 1963 Brewing ceased in December 1968 and the site was sold to the developer, MEPC plc. The brewery was demolished in 1974 and, after archaeological investigations had been concluded, construction of the Friary Centre began in 1978. (Note: The Friary Centre was opened by Princess Alexandra in November 1980.)

=== Transport and communications ===
The east–west route along the North Downs has been in use since ancient times. In the late 19th century it was dubbed the Pilgrims Way, but there is no convincing evidence of its use by pilgrims. The route consists of multiple parallel tracks and hollow ways running along the top of and beneath the North Downs escarpment and is typical of other ridgeway routes in the UK and Europe. Similarly, the path alongside the River Wey, running broadly north–south, is also likely to have been used since antiquity. By the Tudor period, this route had become an important military supply line, linking London and Chatham to Portsmouth. A turnpike road through Guildford, between London and Portsmouth, was created in 1749 and nine years later the roads across the Hog's Back and towards Leatherhead were also turnpiked. The present Farnham Road was built c. 1800. The most recent major change to the local road network was the opening of the A3 Guildford Bypass in 1934.

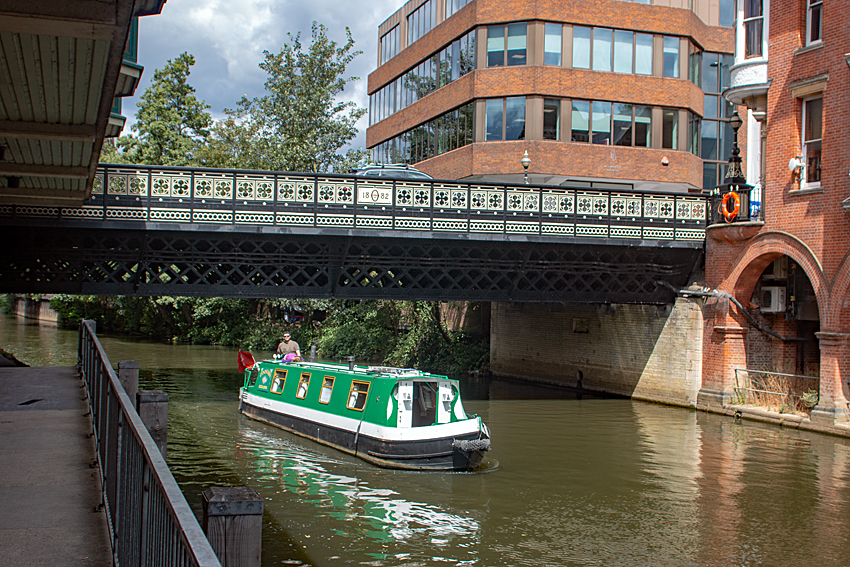
Onslow Bridge, River Wey Navigation

The River Wey has been used for navigation since ancient times and during the Medieval period, there is thought to have been a wharf at Millmead. The River Wey Navigation was authorised by Act of Parliament in 1651. Twelve locks (including two flood locks), and 9 mi (14 km) of new cuts were constructed between the River Thames and Guildford, and the waterway opened in 1653. The navigation had a positive impact on the economy of west Surrey. By the end of the 17th century, timber was being transported via the river from the county boundary with West Sussex and in 1724, Daniel Defoe wrote that corn from Farnham was being sent by barge to London. The Act also allowed passengers to be transported via the Wey and the maximum one-way fare was capped at 1s, which was raised in 1671 to 1s 4d.

The Godalming Navigation was authorised in 1760 and was completed four years later. Four locks were built as part of the works and the Town Bridge was altered to allow barges to pass beneath it. The period of the American War of Independence (1775–1783) was particularly profitable for the two waterways, and a total of 17,000 tonnes of cargo was transported in 1776. (Note: The Wey and Arun Canal between Shalford and Pallingham was opened in September 1816 and closed in July 1871. Traffic volumes were never high and the canal had little impact on the economic prosperity of Guildford.) Traffic on the Wey and Godalming Navigations declined following the opening of the railway lines in the late 1840s. The National Trust acquired the two waterways in the 1960s and have owned them ever since.

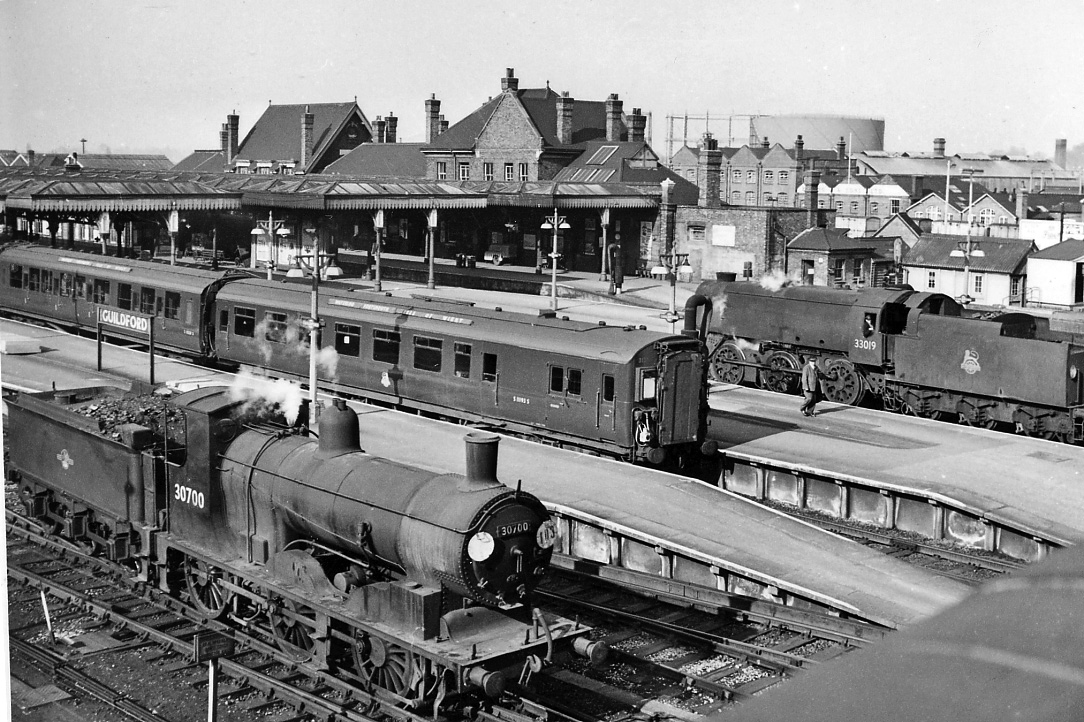
Guildford railway station (1958)

The first railway to be constructed in Surrey was the London to Southampton line, which opened in stages from May 1838. Woking railway station, (Note: Woking station, initially known as Woking Common, was the terminus of the line from Nine Elms until the section to Winchfield opened in September 1838.) was built on the south side of the tracks for the convenience of those travelling by stagecoach from Guildford and quickly became the railhead for the western half of the county. Guildford railway station opened in 1845 as the terminus of a branch from Woking. Four years later, the line was extended to Godalming and the Reading, Guildford and Reigate Railway opened at the same time. The final railway line, the line from Surbiton via Effingham Junction was opened in February 1888, with a new station to the northeast of the town centre, which was later named London Road (Guildford). (Note: The railway line from Guildford to Horsham via Cranleigh opened to passengers in October 1865 and closed in June 1965.)

=== Commerce and industry ===
It is unclear when the first market took place at Guildford, but by 1276 one was being held in the High Street every Saturday. In the 1530s, there were three markets each week, for corn (the most profitable), for cattle, and for general produce and household items. In 1561, a market house was built "beneath the Gild Hall", but by 1626 it was no longer suitable to store the "graine accustimablie sold there" and the corn market was moved to the Tun Inn on the south side of the High Street. A purpose-built Corn Exchange was erected there in 1818. In 1865, the market was relocated to North Street and in 1895, it moved to Woodbridge Road.

Guildford's early prosperity was founded on the wool trade. The North Downs provided good grazing land for sheep, there were local deposits of Fuller's earth in Surrey and the Wey provided a source of both water and power for fulling mills. The town specialised in the manufacture of kersey, a coarse cloth, dyed and sold as "Guildford Blue". The Italian merchant, Francesco di Marco Datini, is known to have purchased cloth from Guildford in the late 14th century and by the end of the 16th century, there were at least six dye works in the town. The trade began to decline at the end of the Tudor period, possibly as a result of fraudulent activity on the part of the wool merchants, who were accused of stretching the cloth. Attempts to revive the struggling industry in the early 17th century were unsuccessful and the last remaining fulling mill was converted to grind corn in 1714.

After the death of their father in 1882, brothers Charles Arthur and Leonard Gates took over the running of his shop, which held the local distribution franchise for Gilbey's wines and spirits, and also sold beer. However, in 1885, the brothers were persuaded to join the temperance movement, and they poured their entire stock into the gutters of the High Street. Left with no livelihood, they converted their now empty shop into a dairy. Using a milk separator, they bought milk from local farmers, and after extracting the cream and whey, sold the skim back to the farmers for pig feed. In 1888 three more of the Gates brothers and their sons joined the business, which led to the formal registration of the company under the name of the West Surrey Central Dairy Company, which after the development of its dried milk baby formula in 1906 became Cow & Gate.

In 1900, the Dennis Brothers company constructed what was probably the first purpose-built car factory in the country, on Bridge Street. This is now known as the Rodboro Buildings, after a later occupant. The company soon outgrew the site, and between 1905 and 1913 production was gradually moved to a new factory near Woodbridge Hill.

=== Guildford in the World Wars ===
At the start of the Second World War, 2500 children were evacuated from southwest London to the Guildford area and in June the following year, evacuees arrived from Brighton. (Note: The Wandsworth Technical Institute was also evacuated from southwest London to Guildford and shared the campus of Guildford Technical Institute in Stoke Park for the duration of the war.) The borough council built 18 communal air raid shelters, including the shelter at Foxenden Quarry, capable of accommodating 1000 people. In late 1940, six British Restaurants were opened in the town and, in May the following year, the first nursery school for children aged between two and five was opened, enabling their mothers to participate in war work. Over the course of the war, seven people were killed in the town as a result of enemy bombing, three of whom died when a V-1 flying bomb landed in Aldersey Road in August 1944. (Note: The V-1 flying bomb that landed in Aldersey Road in August 1944 was the second to hit Guildford. The first landed in Stoke Park in June 1944 and although there were no casualties, nearby houses were damaged by the bomb blast.)

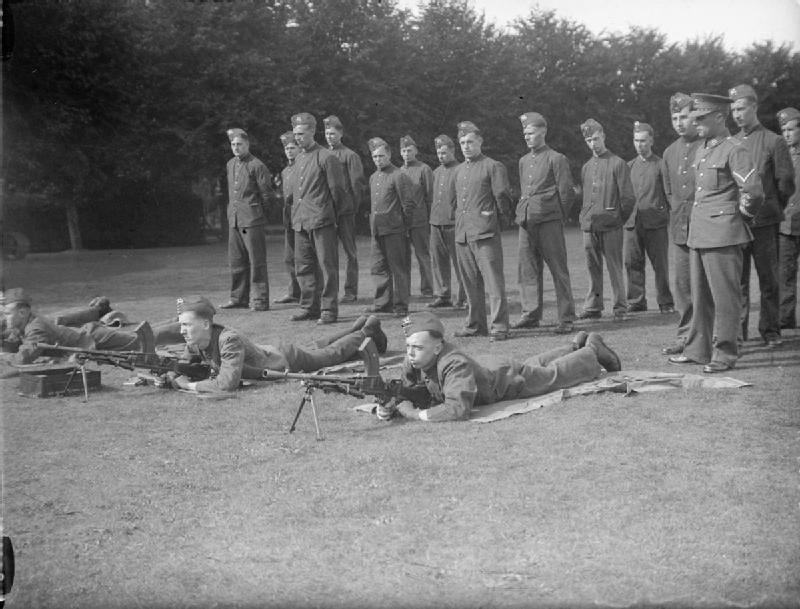
Members of the Queen's Royal Regiment (West Surrey) learning to fire the Bren Gun at Guildford in 1939

At the start of the war, Stoughton Barracks became a training centre for army recruits and George VI visited twice in late 1939. The defence of the town was the responsibility of the 4th Battalion of Surrey Home Guard and defensive installations included dragon's teeth close to London Road station, numerous pillboxes and an anti-tank ditch that was dug across Stoke Park. (Note: The GHQ Stop Line B ran to the south of Guildford along the line of the Greensand Ridge.) Local factories were rededicated to the war effort: The Dennis works produced Churchill tanks, water pumps, bombs and aircraft parts, RFD in Stoke Road produced life rafts and flotation aids for the Royal Navy and Warner Engineering produced tank tracks and brass bomb noses.

=== Cathedral and University ===
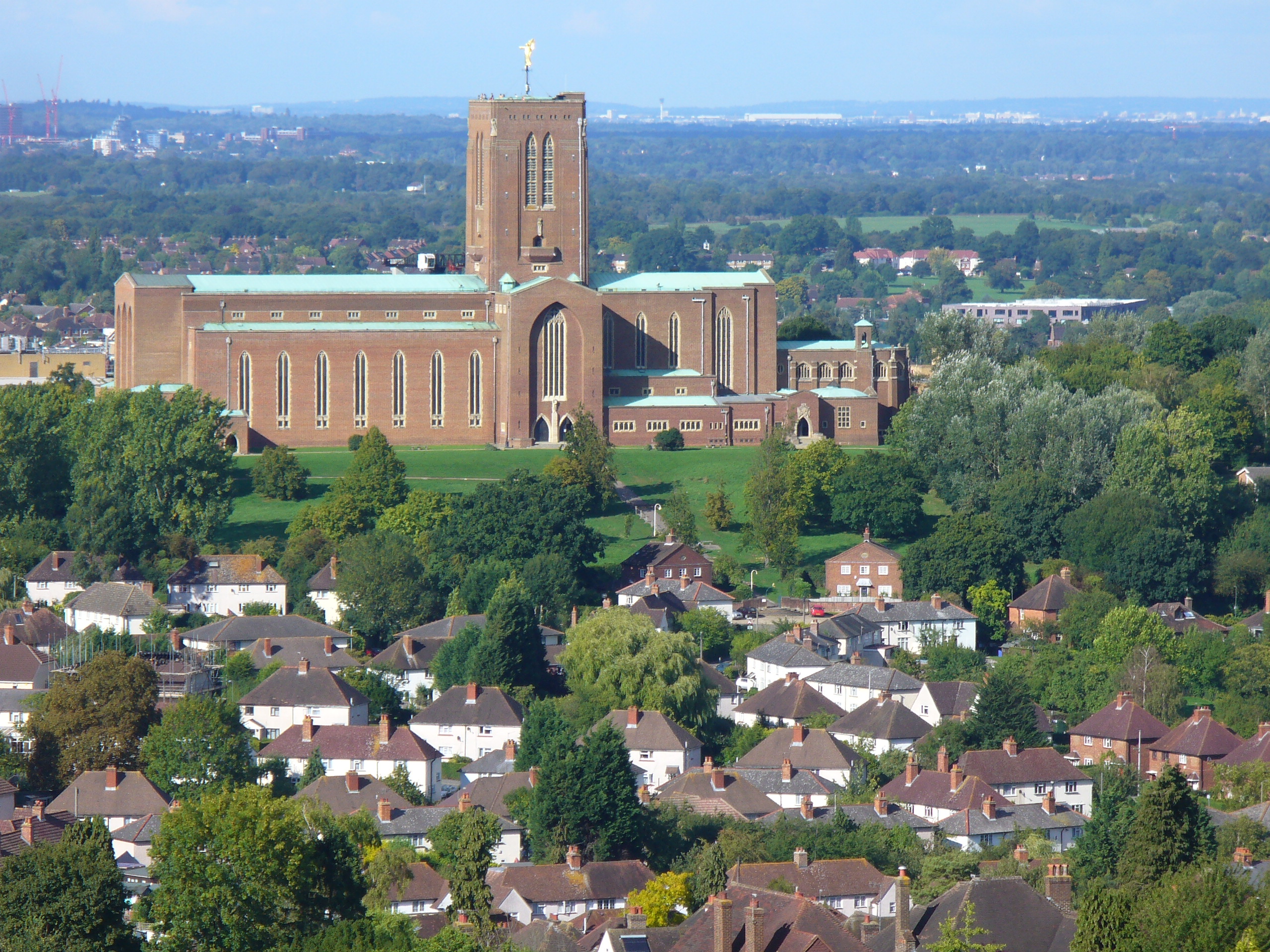
Guildford Cathedral

The Diocese of Guildford was created in 1927 out of the northern part of the Diocese of Winchester. Holy Trinity Church, the largest church in the town, became the cathedral. However, by May of the following year, it was obvious that it was too small to hold the status permanently and the Diocesan Conference resolved to build a new cathedral in the town. In November 1927, The Earl of Onslow offered 6 acres (2.4 ha) of land at the summit of Stag Hill as the site. (Note: Before the construction of the cathedral, Stag Hill was part of Guildford Park Farm and was used for growing cereal crops. Although The Earl of Onslow had given the six acres at the summit to the Diocese of Guildford, the rest of the hill was auctioned. The remaining land was bought by Viscount Bennett of Calgary, a former Prime Minister of Canada, who lived at Mickleham. Bennett donated his purchase to the people of Guildford.)

The design of the cathedral, by Edward Maufe, was chosen following an open competition. The building is constructed of bricks made from the clay excavated for the foundations and crypt. The foundation stone was laid in 1936, but by the outbreak of the Second World War, only the choir had been completed. (Note: Special permission was granted at the start of the war to finish the roof of the choir and to provide a temporary covering for the transepts.) The crypt was finished following the end of the war and was dedicated in 1947. Building work on the rest of the structure was also resumed and the consecration service took place on 17 May 1961. Construction work finally ceased in 1965. (Note: The Grade II*-listed building is the only cathedral in the south of England to be built on a new site since the Middle Ages and is only the third Anglican cathedral to be built in England since the 17th century.)

The campaign to found a university in Guildford began as an initiative of the local Rotary Club in 1962, to explore an approach to the University Grants Commission. At around the same time, the governors of the Battersea College of Advanced Technology were looking for a new campus, as their institution had outgrown its own south London site. A year later, the Robbins Report recommended that all colleges of advanced technology should be given the status of universities. In May 1963, Edward Boyle, the Secretary of State for Education, announced that the Battersea College would relocate to Guildford as the University of Surrey. The northern part of Stag Hill was chosen as the campus and the construction of the first buildings began in January 1966. The Royal Charter was granted in September of the same year and the first students were officially admitted in the autumn of 1968.

=== Guildford pub bombings ===
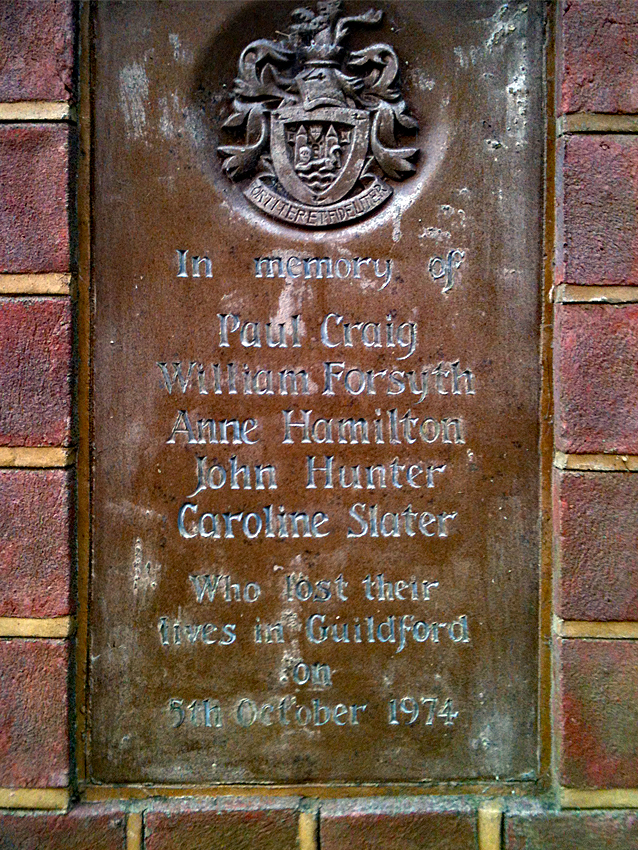
Guildford Bombing Memorial

On the evening of 5 October 1974, the Provisional Irish Republican Army detonated two gelignite bombs at two pubs in the town. The venues are thought to have been chosen as they were popular with off-duty military personnel from Aldershot Garrison. The first bomb exploded at the Horse and Groom in North Street at 8:50 pm, killing two members of the Scots Guards, two members of the Women's Royal Army Corps and one civilian. The second exploded around 35 minutes later at the Seven Stars in Swan Lane, injuring six members of staff and one customer.

In early December 1974, Surrey Police arrested three men and a woman, later collectively known as the Guildford Four. A few days later, seven further individuals were arrested who became known as the Maguire Seven. The Guildford Four were convicted for carrying out the bombings in October 1975 and received life sentences. All four maintained their innocence and, after a campaign of almost fifteen years, their convictions were quashed in October 1989.

=== Modern Guildford ===
In the 21st century Guildford still has a High Street paved with granite setts, and is one of the most expensive places to buy property in the UK outside London. The town has a general street market held on Fridays and Saturdays. A farmers' market is usually held on the first Tuesday of each month. There is a Tourist Information Office, guided walks and various hotels including the historic Angel Hotel which long served as a coaching stop on the main London to Portsmouth stagecoach route.

== Geography ==
=== Eastern districts ===
Charlotteville is one of the first planned suburbs in Britain. The estate was funded by a local doctor, Thomas Sells, and named after his wife, Charlotte. It was developed by the Guildford architect Henry Peak in 1862 and is loosely bound between Shalford Road and Sydenham Road, encompassing the beauty spot of Pewley Down. The area's roads were named after English doctors, including Addison Road, Cheselden Road, Harvey Road and Jenner Road. Public footpaths lead from the town through Charlotteville to the downs and towards St Martha's Hill and Albury. It houses a great many cottages and a few large, mostly privately owned properties. The official designation of the heart of Charlotteville as a conservation area means that Peak's work may survive. The development introduced institutions such as the Cork Club, the Charlotteville Cycling Club, founded in 1903 with the then mayor as its first president, and the Charlotteville Jubilee Trust charity, formed at the time of the Golden Jubilee. Two schools were established in the village - one infant and one junior school. merging to form the Holy Trinity Pewley Down School in the late 2000s. The last of the shops closed in 2006.

Stoke next Guildford, the central northern area of the town, contains Stoke Park and the historic manor of Stoke at its centre, now the site of Guildford College. To the north of the park is the Guildford Spectrum leisure and sports centre. To the south of this mostly residential neighbourhood is London Road railway station, On Stoke Road there is a listed hotel, The Stoke.

Burpham and Merrow are former villages that are now major suburbs of Guildford.

=== Northern districts ===
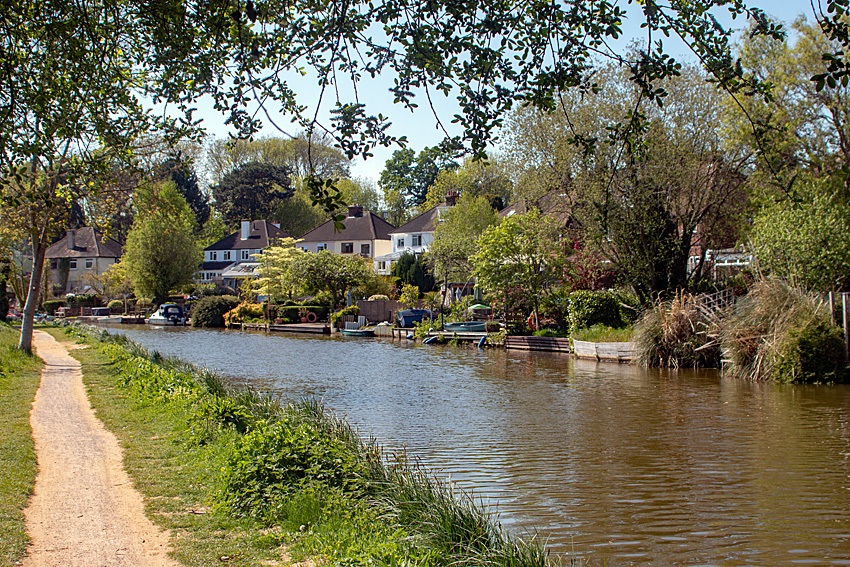
Bellfields from the River Wey.

Bellfields is a suburb in the north of Guildford lying adjacent to Slyfield Industrial Estate and Stoughton. The area includes private estates as well as current and former social housing estates. Christ's College, Guildford's senior school and Pond Meadow special educational needs school are in Bellfields. The neighbourhood includes St Peter's Shared Church and the Guildford Family Centre.

Slyfield is a small mixed land-use area north of Guildford that is largely indeterminate from Bellfields, however to its east is Guildford's largest industrial and commercial park, Slyfield Industrial Estate. There was a cattle market held in the south of the industrial area until 2000 which moved to Maidstone, Kent. Slyfield has a community hall and a school, Weyfield Primary. To the north of Slyfield is Stoke Hill, on top of which is a park, Stringer's Common, across which is the Jacobs Well neighbourhood which is part of Worplesdon civil parish.

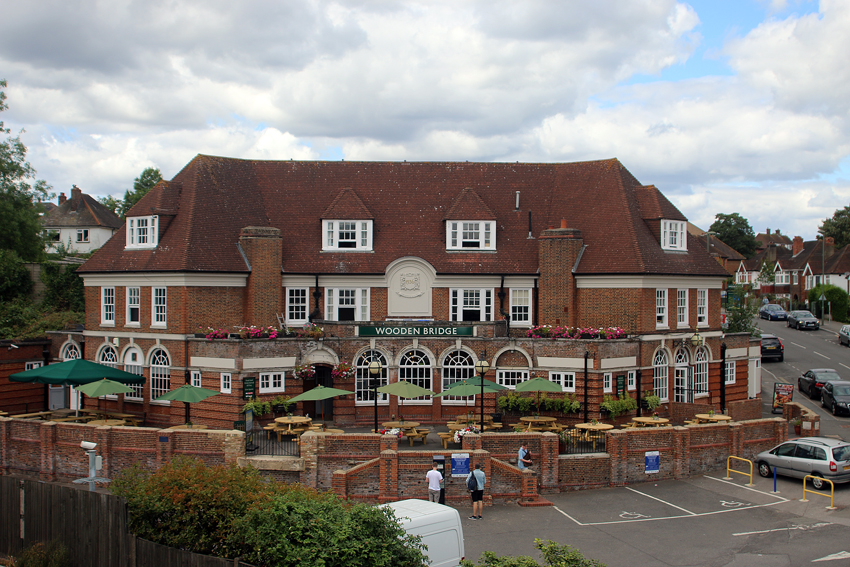
Wooden Bridge pub, Stoughton

Stoughton is a mainly residential suburb north of Guildford town centre. It is the location of the former Stoughton Barracks, which was redeveloped for housing in the 1990s and renamed Cardwell's Keep. In Stoughton is The Wooden Bridge pub where both the Rolling Stones and Eric Clapton performed concerts at the early stages of their respective careers. Another pub of historic note was The Royal Hotel in Worplesdon Road, which hosted an early U2 concert and was owned by the former wrestler Mick McManus. This is now a Chinese restaurant. Stoughton has one junior school, Northmead Junior School and one infant school, Stoughton Infant School.

Jacob's Well is another former village that is now a major suburb of Guildford.

=== Western districts ===
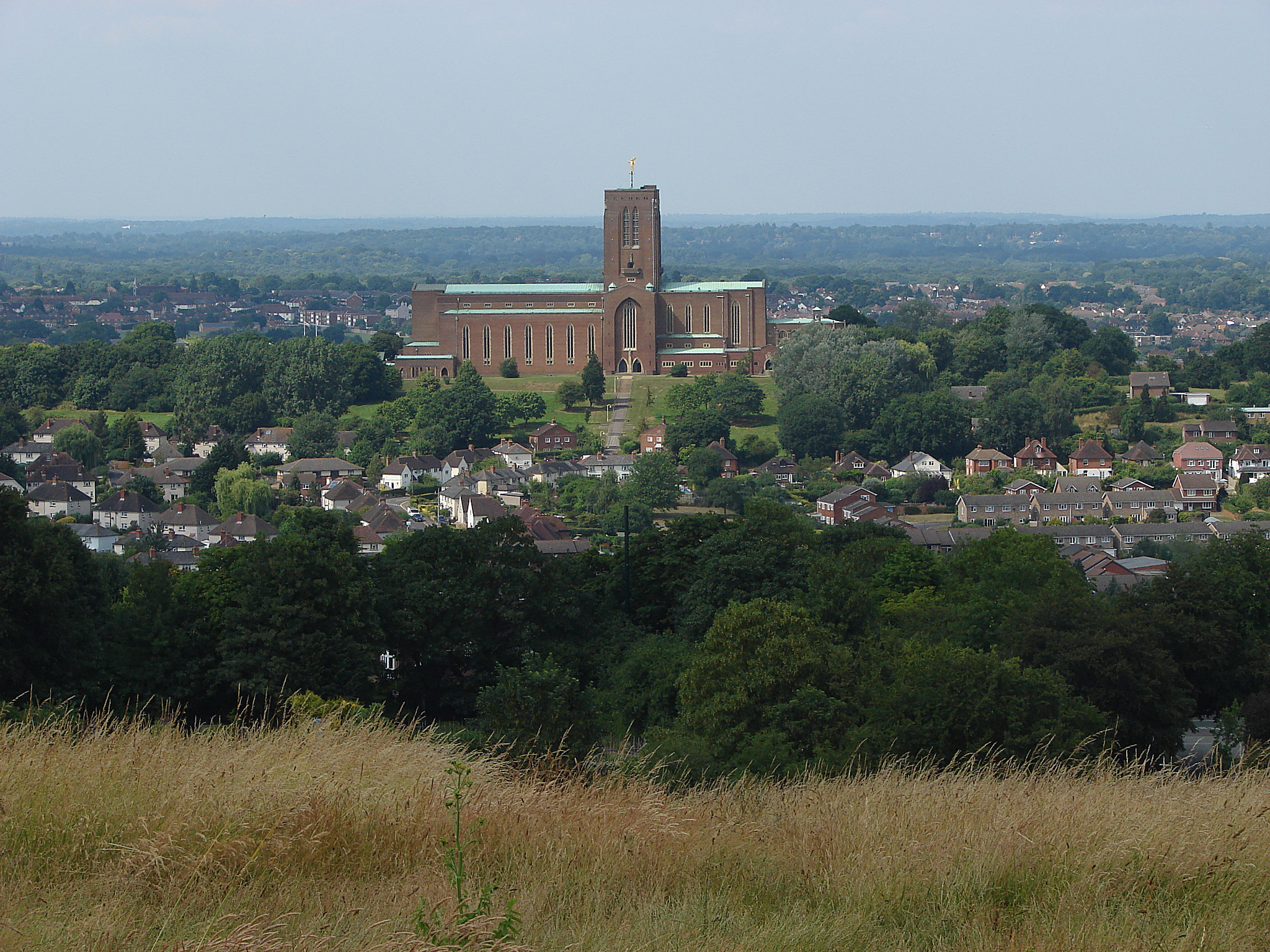
Dennisville below the Cathedral

Guildford Park and Dennisville are small residential neighbourhoods immediately south of and at the foot of Stag Hill. Dennisville was founded in 1934 to provide accommodation for workers at Dennis Brothers Woodbridge Hill factory. Both neighbourhoods are close to Guildford railway station to the southeast and become, without division, Onslow Village to the south. As the University occupies the top and north of Stag Hill, it is a popular location for student lodgings.

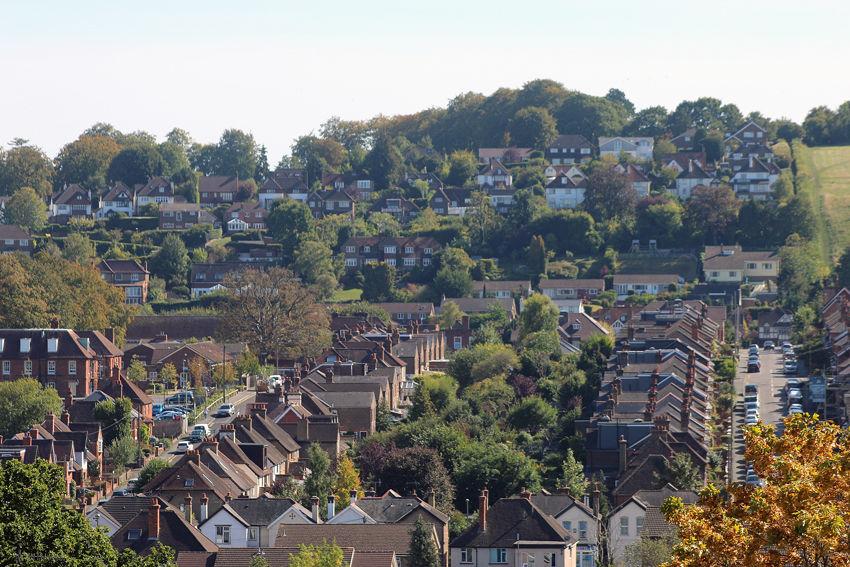
Onslow village viewed from the cathedral

Onslow Village is a sloped suburb on the western outskirts of Guildford. It, with one outlying road continuation, forms a wedge between the A3 road and A31 roads south of the junction of the A3 and Egerton Road, Guildford's Cathedral Turn and directly below Henley Fort, the 1880s built London Defence Position and a Scheduled Monument. The area consists of a number of residential streets many of which are characterised by beech hedges. Parts of Onslow Village have been designated as conservation areas, enforcing a number of planning restrictions that are intended to protect the character and identity of the locality. Local amenities include the 5th Guildford Scout Group, a community news website, a Tennis Club and Onslow Arboretum. It also has its own football team, Onslow FC, established in 1986.

There is a small village centre, with a parade of shops and a village hall. Onslow has one infant school, Onslow Infant School, as well as Queen Eleanor's School, a primary school. The local Anglican church is All Saints.

The Village also has a Residents' association, the Onslow Village Residents' Association (OVRA) which was set up in 1956 and whose object is to "safeguard the amenities of Onslow village and to promote the welfare, interests and well-being of the residents".

The Onslow Village Society was formed with the aim to tackle the acute shortage of decent working-class housing following the First World War. Onslow Village Ltd acquired 646 acres (261 hectares) or just over a square mile of land from the Earl of Onslow in 1920 for approximately one-quarter of its market value at the time. The aim was to create a garden city to be modelled on the ideas of Ebenezer Howard's Garden City Movement. It was their intention to build a self-contained community with smallholdings, public buildings, open spaces, recreation grounds, woodland and a railway station, as well as developing sites for churches, hotels and factories. On Saturday 1 May 1920, ten weeks after the formation of the Society, the foundations of the first two houses were laid and by March 1922 ninety-one houses had been built. Due to a lack of funding the scheme never reached full completion, with about 600 houses actually being built. Original drawings however showed that there were further plans to develop the farmland at Manor Farm, north of the A3. By the mid-1970s, one-third of the properties were still owned by Onslow Village Ltd. Then, in 1984, the company was wound up and many shareholders and tenants had the chance to buy their homes at affordable prices.

Onslow Village never got its railway station, however, it did eventually get its woodland: the Onslow arboretum, developed by Guildford Borough Council as a specialist collection of eighty tree species from around the world. The Onslow arboretum is located right next to the recreation area which has its own park, a large field, several tennis courts, toilets and a scout hut.

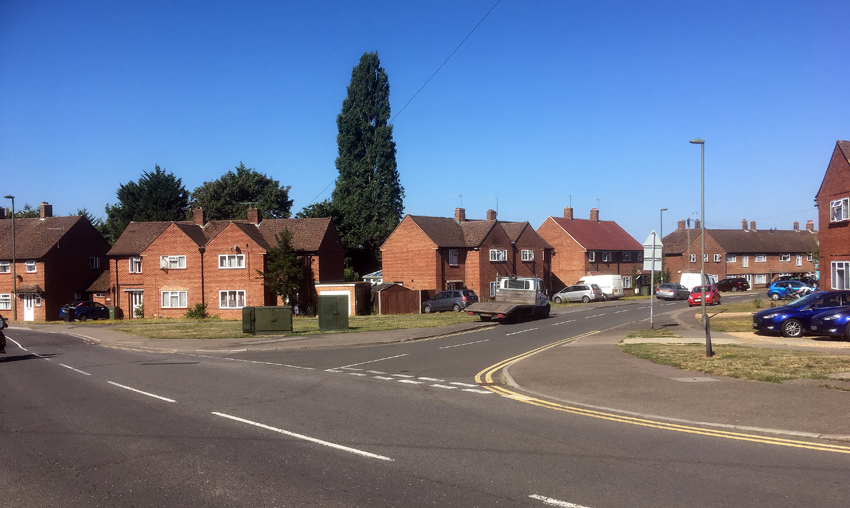
Park Barn Estate, Guildford

Park Barn consists of a former and present social housing estate in Guildford. It is bordered to the south by the railway line, the east by Westborough, the north by Rydes Hill and the west by Broadstreet Common. The estate is home to King's College, a school for 11 – 16-year-olds. There are also a number of primary schools in the area of Park Barn, including Guildford Grove Primary School, which has a specialist sign-supported rescue base on the site that supports pupils with profound hearing impairments, known as The Lighthouse. The Football team, Park Barn FC, plays in League 4 of the Guildford and Woking Alliance League. Guildford City Boxing Club moved from Bellfields to Cabell Road in Park Barn in 2014.

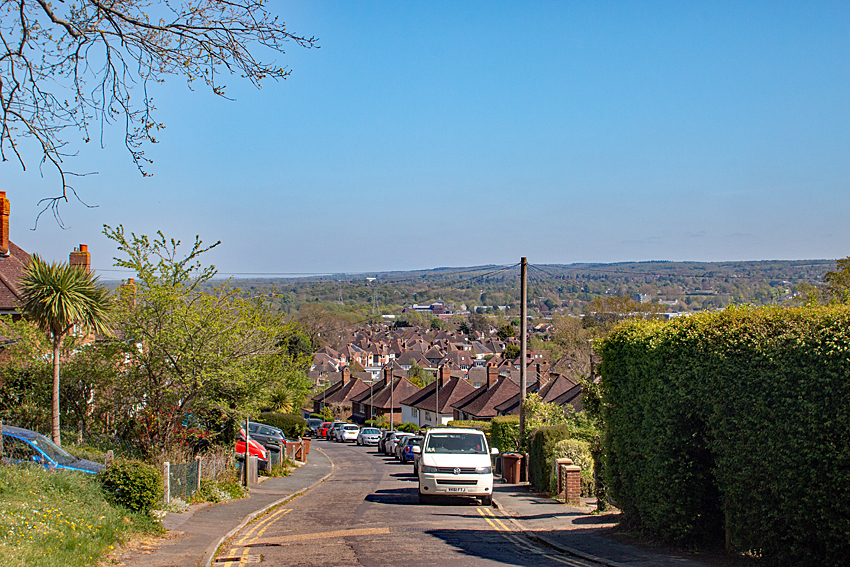
View over Westborough

Adjacent to the Park Barn Estate, the Westborough Estate was built in the 1920s due to the growing population at the start of the 20th century. Westborough is home to a United Reformed church and to a community primary school on Southway. There is a small parade of shops where Southway meets Aldershot Road. Westborough is also a ward of the Borough of Guildford. Its population at the 2011 Census was 9,307.

== National and local government ==
The town is in the parliamentary constituency of Guildford. As of 2024, it is represented at Westminster by Liberal Democrat Zöe Franklin.

Councillors are elected to Surrey County Council every four years. The town is covered by five divisions, each of which elects one councillor. The five divisions are: "Guildford East", "Guildford North", "Guildford South-East", "Guildford South-West" and "Guildford West". Although Guildford has historically been regarded as the county town of Surrey, the county council itself has its administrative headquarters in Reigate.

Elections to the borough council take place every four years and a total of 48 councillors serve at any one time. The council is led by an executive committee, consisting of the Leader, a Deputy Leader and six portfolio holders. Each year, one of the councillors serves as "Mayor of Guildford" for a period of twelve months. The role of mayor is primarily ceremonial and the post has little political power. Since April 1982, the council has been based at the Grade II-listed Millmead House, which was built in the late 17th and early 18th centuries.

Guildford has been twinned with Freiburg im Breisgau, Germany since 1979. A link between Guildford and Mukono, Uganda, was established in 2003 and the borough council signed a formal partnership agreement with Dongying, China, in 2017.

== Demography and housing ==
In the 2011 census, the population of Guildford was 79,185. 87.3% of the inhabitants were white, 7.1% were of Asian descent and 2.2% were mixed race.

2011 Census Households
| Area | Population | Households | Owned outright | Owned with a loan | Social rented | Private rented |
|---|---|---|---|---|---|---|
| Guildford | 79,185 | 31,328 | 29.5% | 33.6% | 14.4% | 19.6% |
| South East Region | 8,634,750 | 3,555,463 | 35.1% | 32.5% | 13.7% | 16.3% |

2011 Census Homes
| Area | Detached | Semi-detached | Terraced | Flats and apartments |
|---|---|---|---|---|
| Guildford | 25.9% | 33.3% | 14.2% | 26.7% |
| South East Region | 28.0% | 27.6% | 22.4% | 21.2% |

== Business ==
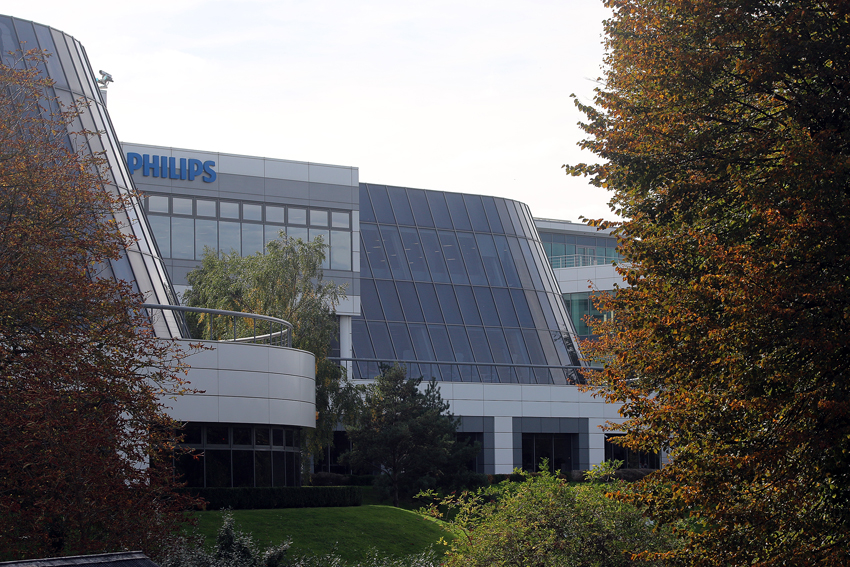
Guildford Business Park by the A25

The 2011 Financial Times annual list of Top 500 Global Companies listed five major businesses with a significant presence in the town; Philips, Ericsson, Colgate-Palmolive, Allianz and Sanofi.

Media Molecule, Lionhead Studios, Hello Games, Criterion Games, Ghost Games and Bullfrog Productions have helped the town become a centre for video game production. The electronic components business, discoverIE Group, with some 4,400 employees, is based at Surrey Research Park.

Military vehicle builders Automotive Technik have a factory in the town. The Surrey Research Park contains a number of world leading companies including satellite manufacturers Surrey Satellite Technology and BOC.

== Public services ==
=== Utilities ===
Until the start of the 18th century, residents of Guildford obtained their water from wells or from the Wey. In 1701, William Yarnold received a grant from the borough corporation to erect a waterwheel and pumps to raise river water to a reservoir at the foot of Pewley Down. A network of pipes, formed from the hollow trunks of elm trees, was installed to distribute water through the town. A new well was sunk in the town in 1865, but contamination by sewage resulted in an outbreak of typhoid fever. By 1898, the mains water infrastructure in the town was well-developed and included both gas- and coal-powered pumps. In 1952, the Guildford Corporation sold the town's water supply infrastructure to the Guildford, Godalming and District Water Board.

The town's sewerage system, including the wastewater treatment works at Bellfields, was constructed between 1889 and 1895. The current sewage works date from the 1960s, but will be relocated to a site 1.5 km (0.93 mi) to the north, as part of the Slyfield Area Regeneration Project. The move will release land for up to 1500 new homes. The new works are expected to open in 2026.

The first gasworks in Guildford was opened in 1824 and street lighting was installed in May of that year. The construction of a larger facility was authorised by parliament in 1857. The gasworks closed in the late 1960s and the area was cleared for the construction of the Bedford Road Sports Centre and the associated car park. Since 2000, part of the site has been occupied by the Odeon Cinema complex.

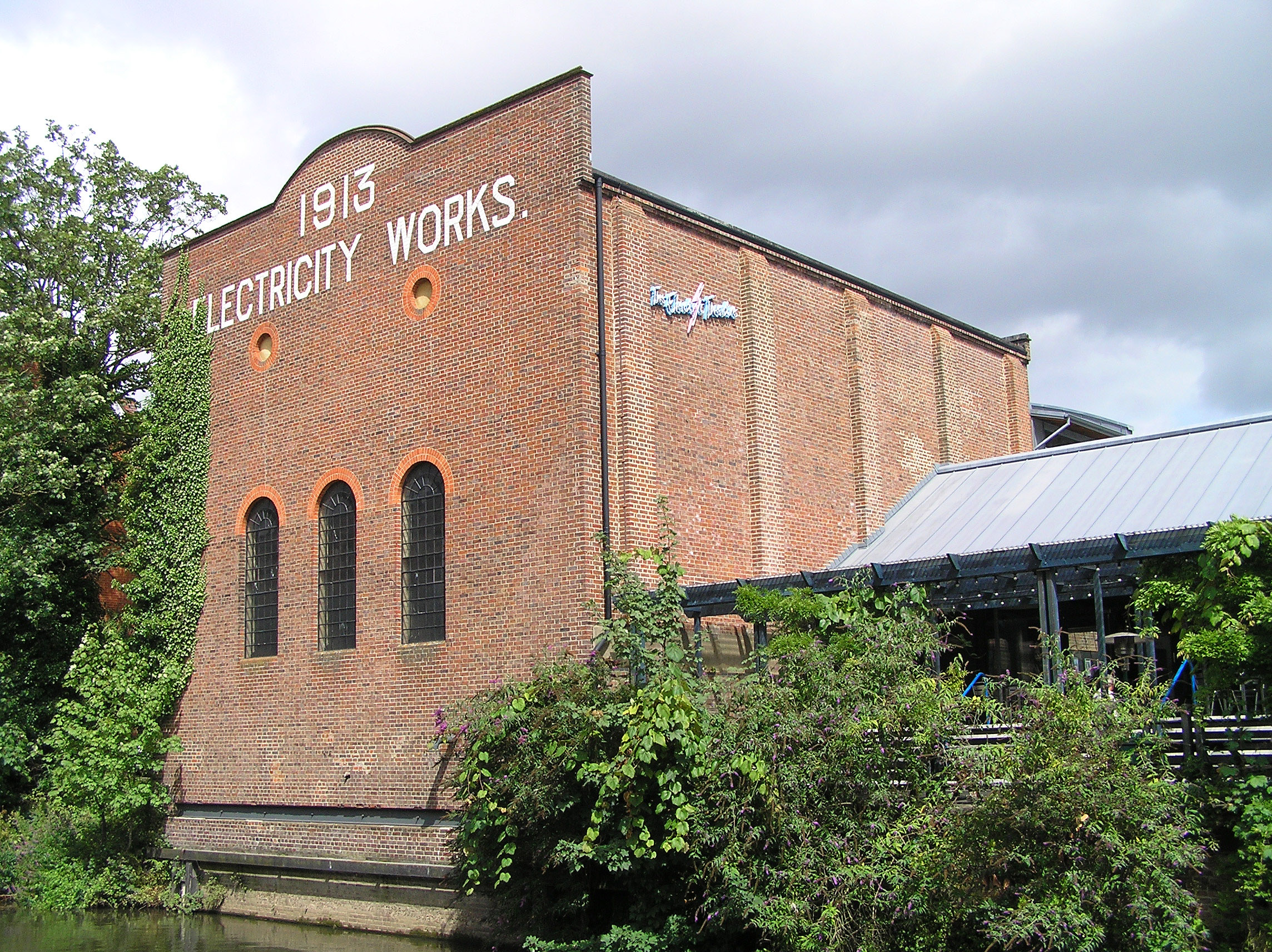
The former Onslow Street power station is now the Electric Theatre.

The first electricity-generating station was opened in 1896 in Onslow Street with an installed capacity of 60 kW. It was rebuilt and extended in 1913 and was replaced in May 1928 by a new plant in Woodbridge Road. (Note: The Woodbridge Road power station used river water for condensing steam and cooling. It had two slender chimneys for the boilers, which delivered 150,000 lb/hr (18.9 kg/s) of steam to the turbo-alternators.) Under the Electricity (Supply) Act 1926, Guildford was connected to the National Grid, initially to a 33 kV supply ring, which linked the town to Woking, Godalming, Farnham, Hindhead and Aldershot. The electricity industry was nationalised in 1948 and ownership of the Woodbridge Road station passed to the British Electricity Authority and then to the Central Electricity Generating Board (CEGB). In 1966, the power station had a generating capacity of 11.25 megawatts (MW) and delivered 9,090 MWh of electricity. The CEGB closed the station in 1968 and it was subsequently demolished.

There have been small-scale renewable electricity installations in Guildford since the start of the 20th century. In around 1907, the inventor, E. Lancaster Burne, erected one of the first wind turbines on Pewley Hill to generate electricity for his house. A hydroelectric project to harness power from the River Wey opened in the former Toll House, part of the Town Mill on Millmead, in 2006. The building, first constructed in 1897, originally housed turbines to pump river water to a reservoir on Pewley Hill. Over its first ten years of operation, the installation generated over 1.5 GWh of electricity, which was supplied direct to the national grid.

=== Emergency services and justice ===
The first police force in Guildford was established by the Guildford Watch Committee in 1836, which appointed nine constables, led by a part-time superintendent. (Note: A night patrol had been established in Guildford in 1759, under the powers of the Watching and Lighting Act.) In 1851, it briefly merged with the Surrey Constabulary, responsible for much of the rest of the county, but the two were separated again three years later. By 1866, the Guildford force had sixteen officers, one of whom had a salary paid by the LSWR. Five additional officers were employed in 1932, when the borough was enlarged.

Between 1840 and 1864, severe outbursts of semi-organised lawlessness, commonly known as the Guy Riots, occurred in Guildford. The violence was focused on celebrations for the Fifth of November, but was amplified by local political issues. (Note: The local municipal elections took place in Guildford on 1 November each year.) The rioters would rampage through the town after nightfall, damaging property and assaulting local residents. Following severe lawlessness in March and September 1863, 200 soldiers were dispatched to the town in anticipation of further violence that November. The army was able to disperse the rioters and four ringleaders were arrested. They were sentenced to hard labour the following April and there was no repeat of the violence in subsequent years.

In 1941, the Guildford police force was amalgamated again with the Surrey Constabulary as a wartime efficiency measure and the merger became permanent in 1947. The following year, the combined force moved its headquarters to Mount Browne in Sandy Lane. As of 2022, the local police force is Surrey Police and Guildford Police Station is at Margaret Road, GU1 4QS, on the site of the former cattle market.

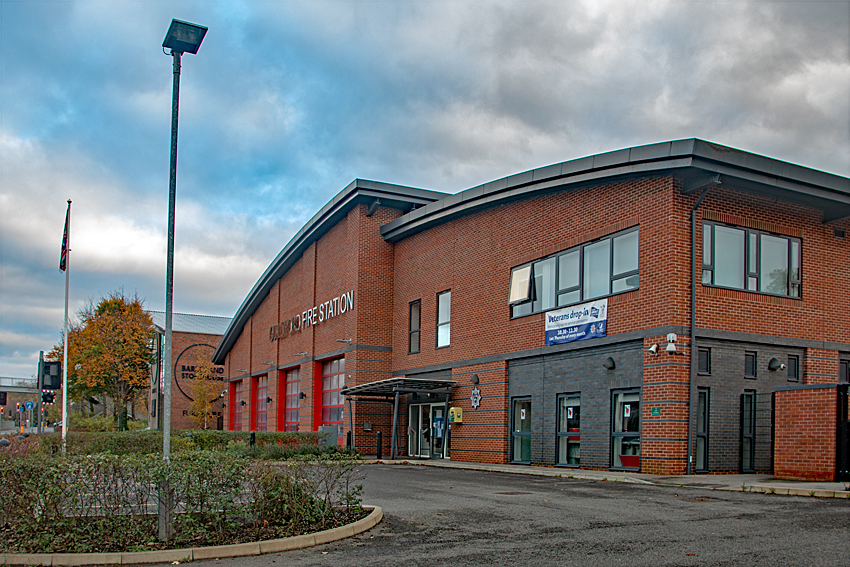
Guildford Fire Station, Ladymead

Guildford Fire Brigade was founded in 1863 as a volunteer force. Initially the horse-drawn fire engine was housed in a shed in North Street, but a brick building (now the public toilets) was built in the same road in 1872 The Guildford Brigade merged with others in Surrey in 1947, when the service became the responsibility of the county council. In 2022, the fire authority for Guildford is Surrey County Council and the town fire station is at Ladymead.

The ambulance service in Guildford was provided by St John Ambulance until 1966, when the county council set up its own service. In 2022, local ambulance services are run by the South East Coast Ambulance Service and the ambulance station is on London Road.

=== Healthcare ===
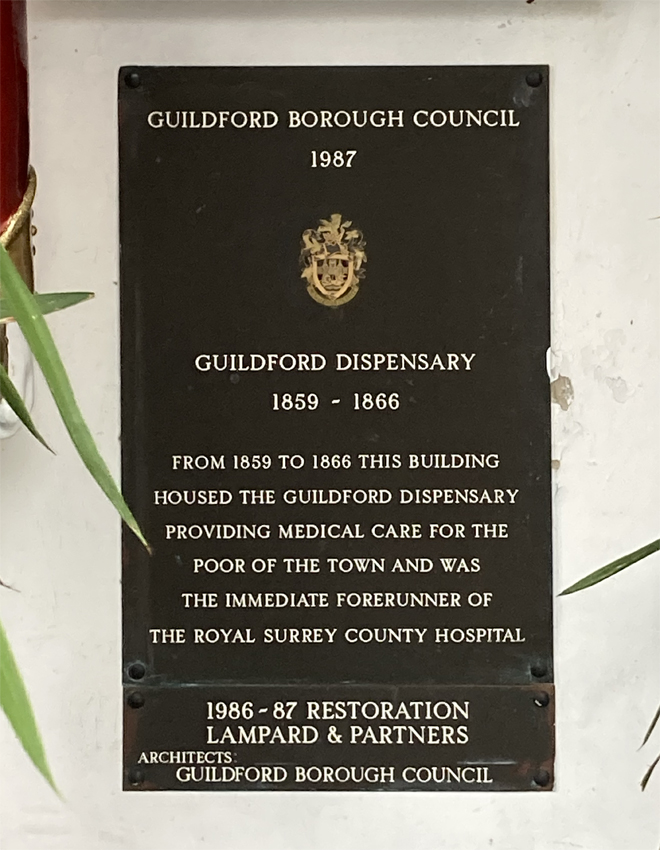
Plaque commemorating the Guildford Dispensary, 1859–1866

The first medical facility in the town, the Guildford Dispensary, opened in Quarry Street in January 1860. Supported by private donations, it provided free medical care to the poor, including a home visiting service and an out-patients clinic. During its first year of operation over a thousand patients were treated, highlighting the urgent need for a public hospital in the area. The dispensary closed in 1866, when the Royal Surrey County Hospital opened on Farnham Road.

The land for Farnham Road Hospital was donated by Lord Onslow and was built as a memorial to Prince Albert, who had died in 1861. It opened in 1866 with the name Royal Surrey County Hospital with two wards and 60 beds. In 1948, it became part of the NHS. It acquired its current name in 1980. In 2022, Farnham Road Hospital is a specialist mental health hospital.

The Guildford Infirmary was built in the grounds of the workhouse in 1896 and was initially run by the Guildford Guardians of the Poor. It was renamed the Warren Road Hospital in 1930, when it was taken over by Surrey County Council. (Note: In 1930, the Warren Road Hospital had 190 beds, including five in a dedicated maternity ward.) Shortly before the outbreak of the Second World War, an annexe was built to treat both military and civilian casualties and the hospital became part of the Emergency Hospital Service. In 1945, it became St Luke's Hospital and three years later it was incorporated into the NHS. (Note: Shortly after joining the NHS in 1948, St Luke's Hospital had 450 beds.) It ceased to be a general hospital in January 1980, when much of its operations were transferred to the Royal Surrey County Hospital. St Luke's continued to house a nurses' training facility and to offer outpatients services until 1991. The site finally closed in 1999 and had been redeveloped by 2003.

The current Royal Surrey County Hospital, at Park Barn, opened in stages from January 1980, inheriting its name from its predecessor, which continues to operate as the Farnham Road Hospital. (Note: The hospital was formally opened by Elizabeth II on 27 February 1981.) The St Luke's Wing opened in February 1997, following the closure of St Luke's Hospital. The Royal Surrey County Hospital is the nearest hospital to Guildford town centre with an Accident and Emergency Department.

== Transport ==
=== Buses ===
Guildford is linked by a number of bus routes to surrounding towns and villages in west Surrey. The network is centred on the Friary bus station. Services are operated predominantly by Stagecoach South, but also by Carlone Buses, Compass Bus, Falcon Buses, Safeguard Coaches and White Bus Services.

There are four park & ride car parks surrounding Guildford, which are served by buses to the town centre.

A RailAir coach service runs from the railway station to Heathrow Airport. Route 030, operated by National Express, links the town to London and Portsmouth.

=== Taxis and private hire ===
Guildford Borough Council regulates hackney carriages and private hire vehicles in the borough. Hackney carriages may be hailed, hired from a taxi rank or pre-booked, while private hire vehicles must be booked in advance through a licensed private hire operator.

=== Railway ===
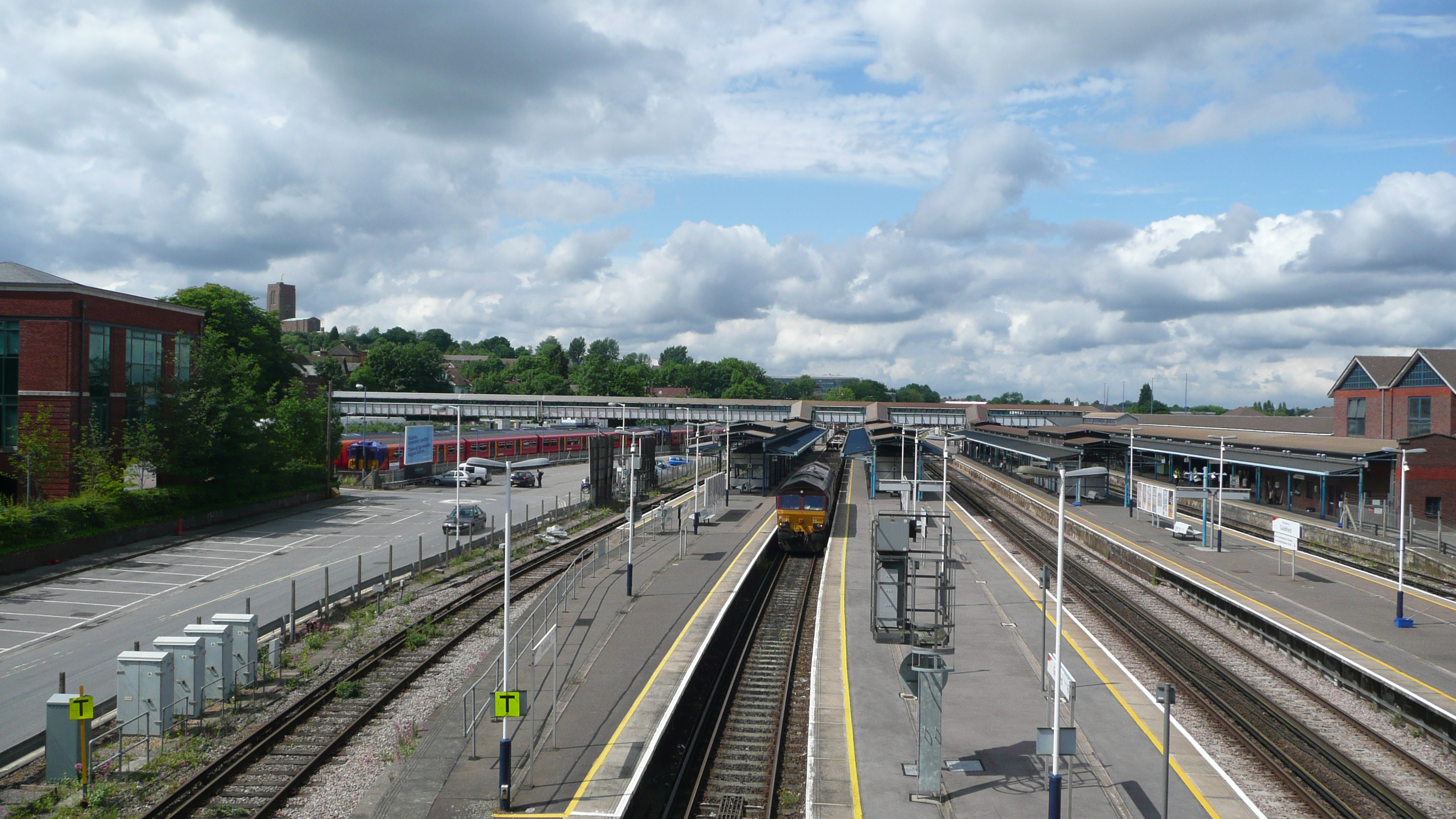
Guildford station

Guildford railway station is located to the north-west of the town centre. It is managed by South Western Railway, which operates most services; their routes run to London Waterloo via Clapham Junction, to Portsmouth Harbour via Godalming and Haslemere, and to Alton via Farnham.

Great Western Railway operates services to Gatwick Airport via Redhill and to Reading via Wokingham.

South Western Railway runs all services from London Road station, which is located to the north-east of the town centre. Trains run to London Waterloo, via Epsom or Oxshott.

=== River navigations ===
The River Wey is navigable from Weybridge to Godalming and the navigation authority is the National Trust.

=== Cycling ===
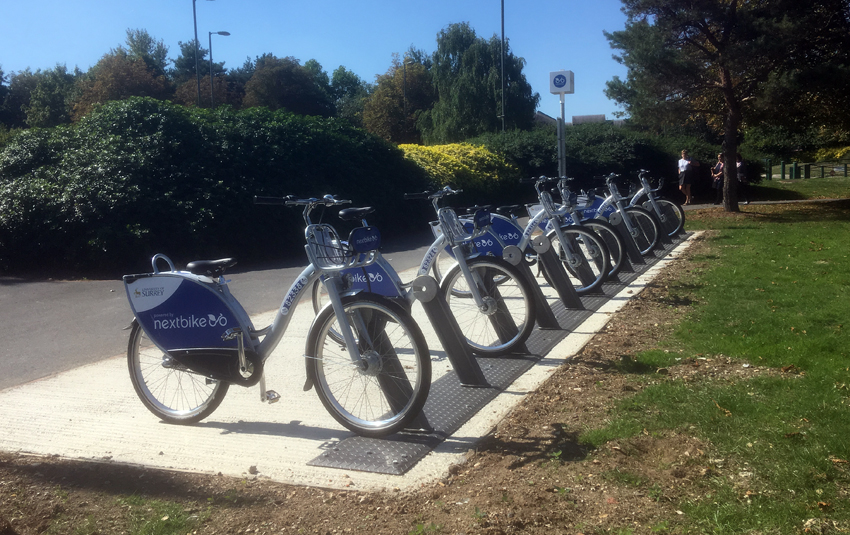
Bike docking station at Surrey Research Park, Guildford

National Cycle Network Route 22, which will connect London to Portsmouth, and Route 223, which connects Chertsey to Shoreham-by-Sea, pass through Guildford. A bike-sharing scheme launched on the University of Surrey campus in August 2018.

=== Long-distance footpaths ===
The North Downs Way, which runs between Farnham and Dover, passes through the outskirts of Guildford, around 0.6 mi (0.97 km) to the south of the town centre. The E2 European long distance path runs along the towpath of the River Wey through Guildford. The Fox Way is a 39 mi (63 km) footpath that circles the town.

== Education ==
=== State-funded schools ===
As in the rest of Surrey, Guildford's state schools operate a two/three age group system. Primary schools in the town include Holy Trinity (which merged with Pewley Down in 1995), Burpham, St Thomas of Canterbury (Catholic), Sandfield Primary School, Boxgrove Primary School and Guildford Grove Primary School. Amongst the junior schools are Bushy Hill, Northmead Junior and Queen Eleanor's C of E. Secondary schools include George Abbot, Guildford County School, St Peter's, King's College and Christ's College.

=== Independent schools ===
The Royal Grammar School was established in 1509. The old school building, which was constructed over the turn of the Tudor and Elizabethan periods and houses a chained library, lies towards the top of High Street. In 1552, the school received the patronage of Edward VI. Nearby is the Royal Grammar preparatory school which is the choir school for Guildford Cathedral.

Other independent schools in the town include Guildford High School (founded 1876), Tormead School (founded 1905), Priors Field School and Rydes Hill Preparatory School.

=== Higher education ===
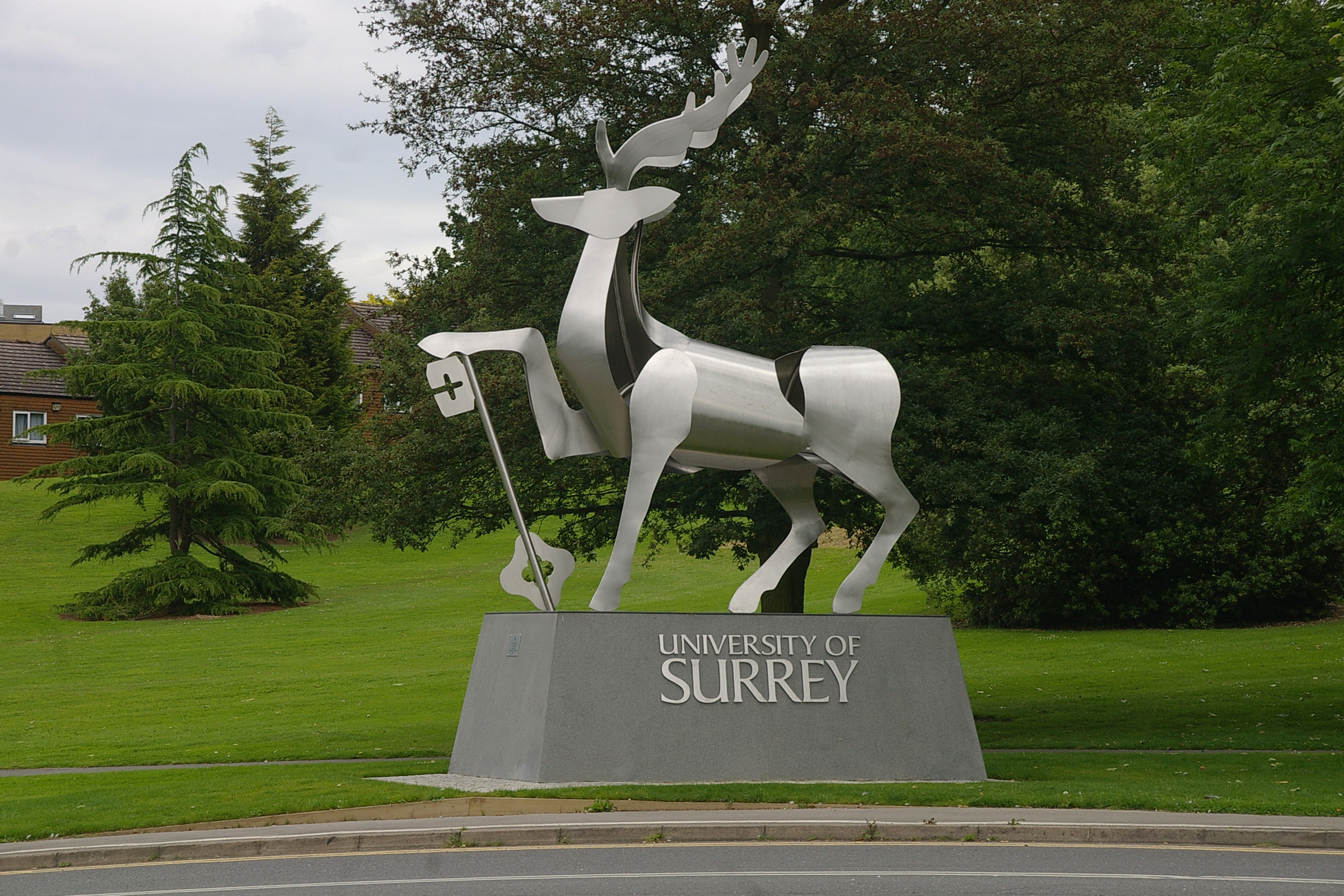
The University of Surrey

The campus of the University of Surrey is in Guildford. Battersea College of Technology (previously the Battersea Polytechnic Institute) moved to the town in 1966, gaining a Royal Charter in order to award its own degrees and changing its name to its current title.

The town is home to the inaugural campus of the University of Law and to the Guildford School of Acting. Other institutions in Guildford include Guildford College of Further and Higher Education (which also occupies the site of the former Guildford School of Art), Academy of Contemporary Music and the Italia Conti Arts Centre.

== Places of worship ==
=== Anglican churches ===
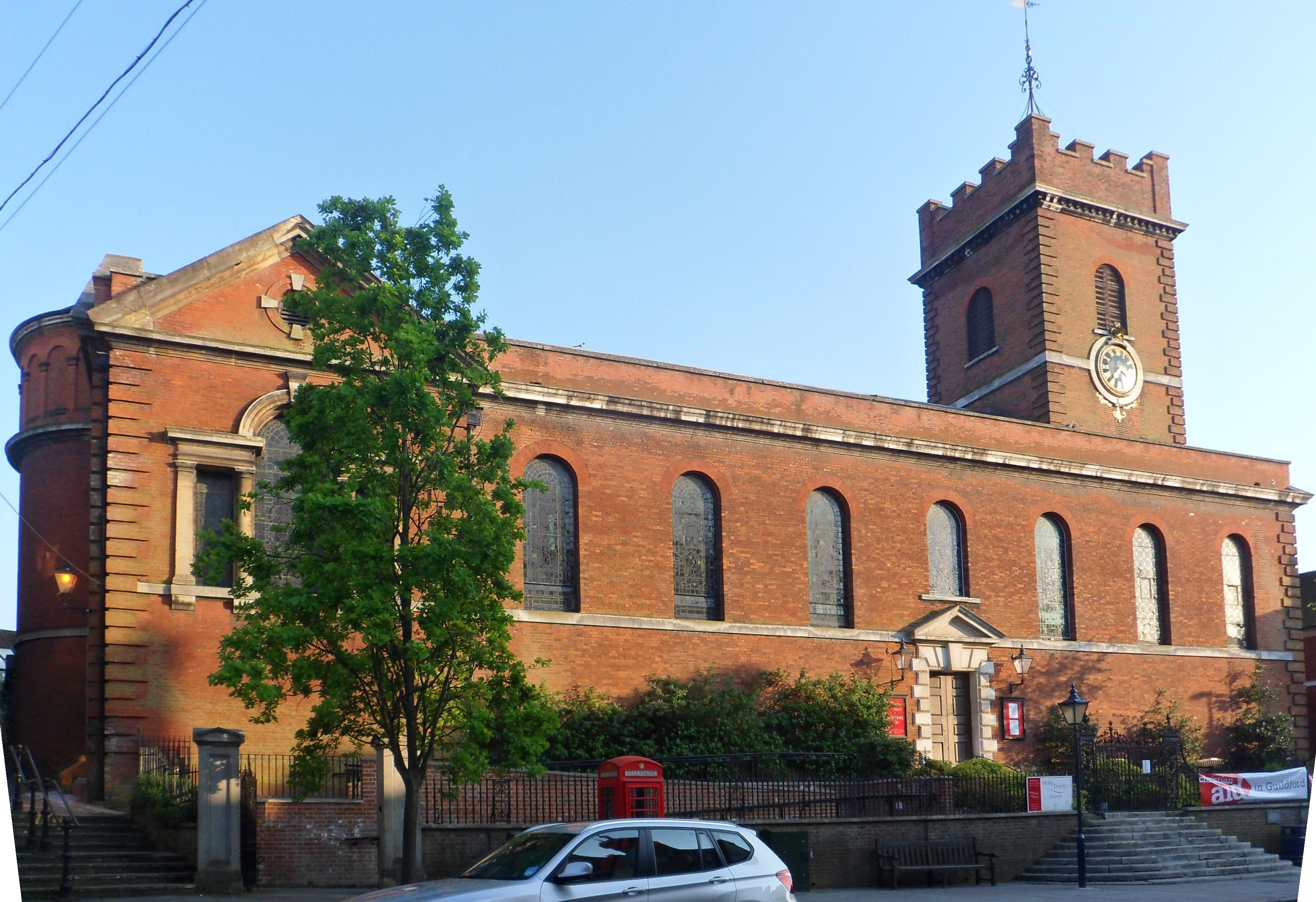
Holy Trinity Church, High Street

The Church of England churches in the town belong to the Guildford Deanery, part of the Diocese of Guildford. All six of the churches are listed, including two that are Grade I listed. (Note: Guildford Cathedral is also grade II* listed.)

St Mary's Church, on Quarry Street, is the oldest place of worship in the town. The tower is thought to have been built before the Norman Conquest and the transepts were constructed in c. 1100. Many structural features have survived from the medieval period, although much of today's church dates from a restoration in 1882. (Note: Since 2013, the local Methodist congregation has held its services at St Mary's.) The oldest part of Holy Trinity Church, at the east end of the High Street, is the Weston Chapel, which dates from c. 1540. The original building is thought to have been constructed in the early medieval period, but it was rebuilt between 1749 and 1763 after the steeple collapsed and destroyed the majority of the building on 23 April 1740. The windows in the nave were altered by Henry Woodyer in 1869 and the transepts were added by Arthur Blomfield in 1888. The original St Nicolas Church, at the western end of the Town Bridge, is also thought to have been constructed in the early medieval period. The Loseley Chapel dates from the 15th century, but the rest of the building was rebuilt in the 1870 by the Gothic Revival architect, Samuel Sanders Teulon.

The oldest parts of the Church of St John the Evangelist at Stoke-next-Guildford were built in the early 14th century. The tower was added in the 15th century and the north chapel in the 16th, when the north aisle was widened. The church includes stained glass designed by Dante Gabriel Rossetti and a monument by John Flaxman. Christ Church, in Waterden Road, was designed by Ewan Christian in 1868 in the 13th-century English Gothic style. The Church of St Saviour, in Woodbridge Road, was consecrated in 1899 and was built in the 14th-century Gothic style.

=== Other Christian churches ===
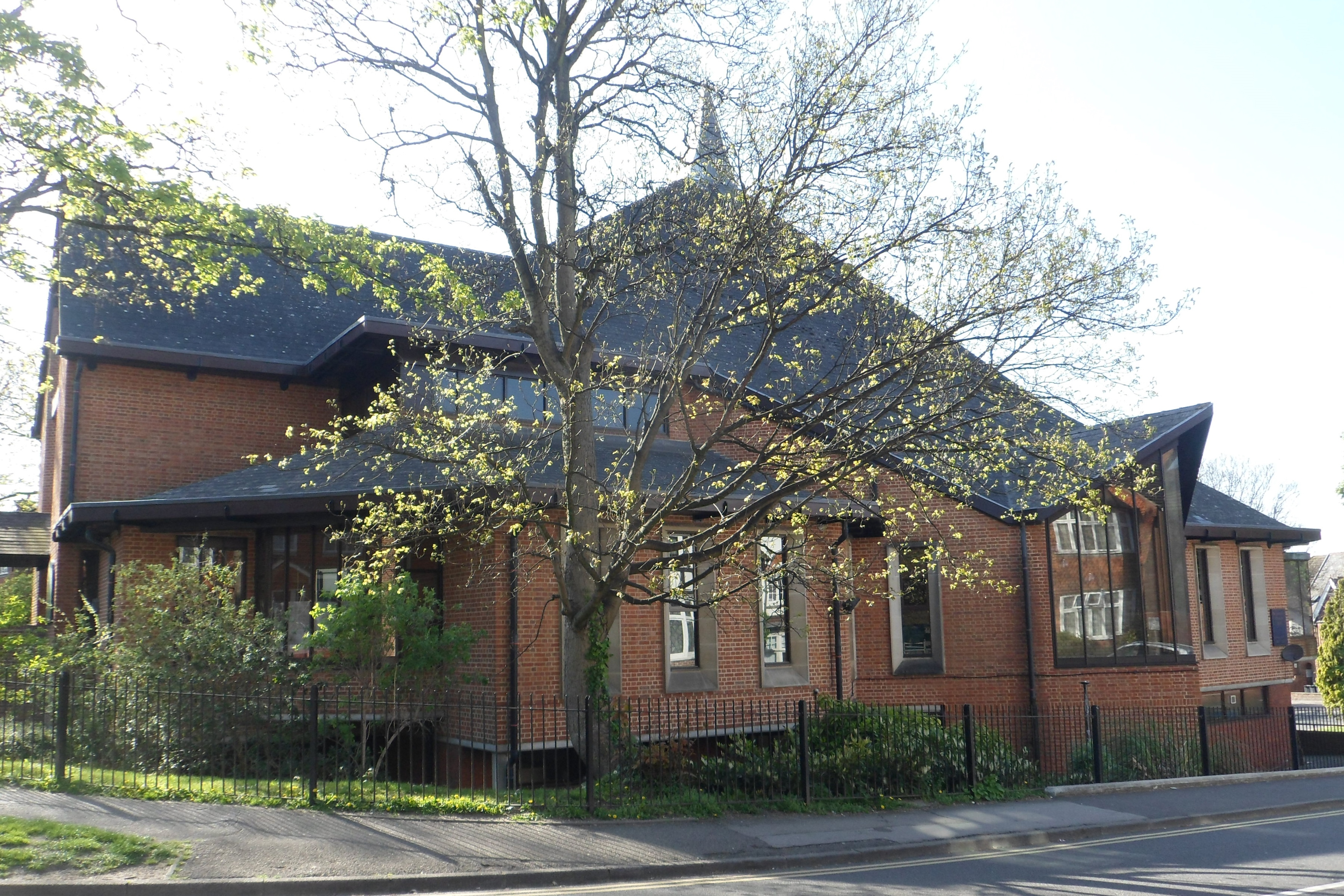
St Joseph's Catholic Church

There are three Roman Catholic churches in Guildford: St Joseph's near the town centre, St Mary's in Rydes Hill and St Pius X in Merrow. The Catholic Parish of Guildford also includes the Church of St Edmund the Confessor at Sutton Place. There are two United Reformed Churches, two Baptist Churches a New Life Baptist Church, a Christadelphian meeting hall, two Methodist Churches, the Salvation Army, Bethel Chapel, Brethren Assembly, Church in a Club Stoughton, Elim Penecostal Church, Chinese Christian Fellowship, and five Independent Churches

=== Quaker meeting house ===
The first Quaker meetings in Guildford are thought to have taken place in 1668 and a burial ground was purchased five years later in North Street. The current meeting house, in Ward Street, was completed in 1806 and retains its original, panelled meeting room. (Note: The Quaker burial ground was transferred to the Guildford Corporation in 1927 and became the public open space, known as Quakers' Acre.)

=== Jewish synagogues ===
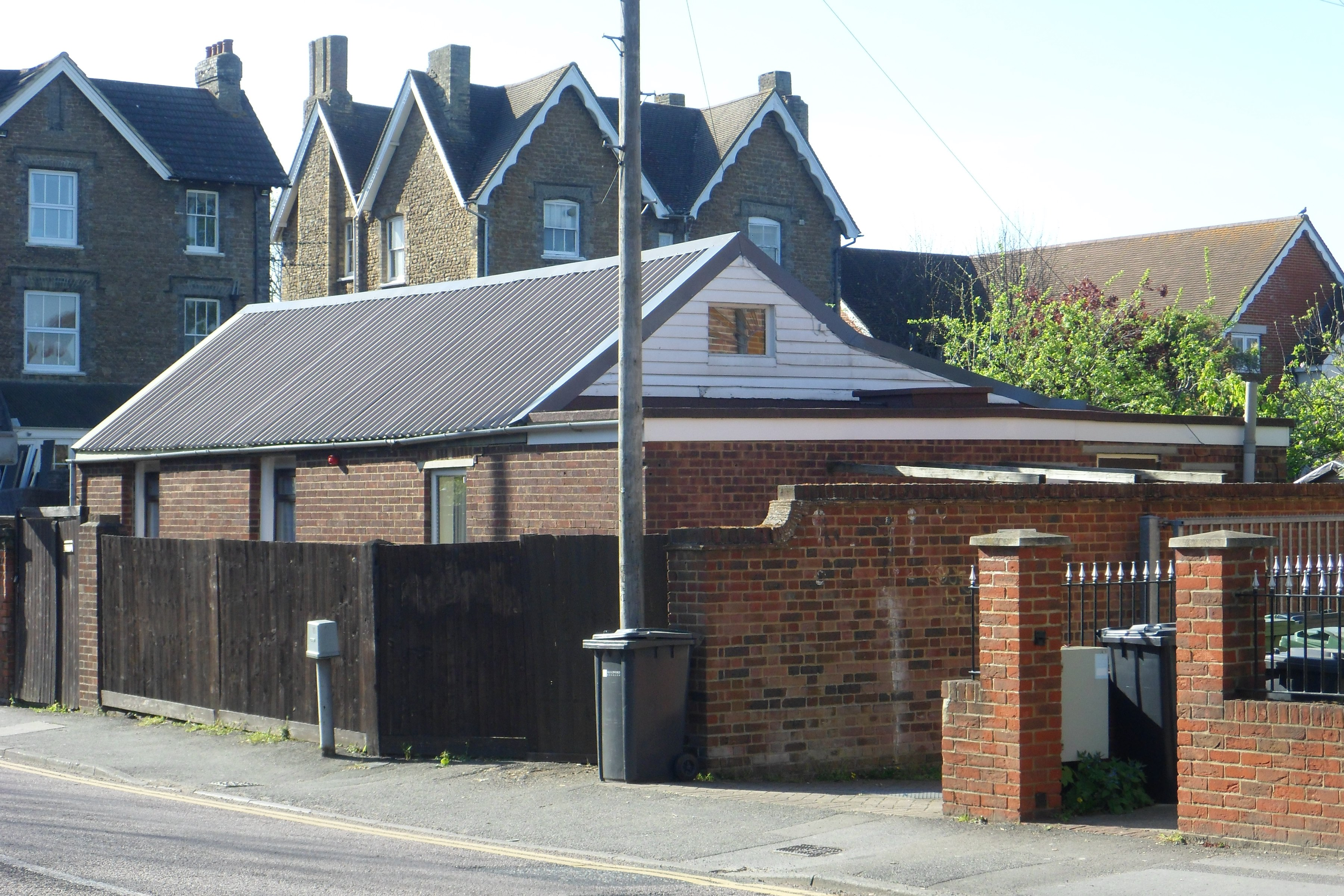
Guildford Synagogue, York Road

In 1995, a chamber was discovered in the High Street, which is considered to be the remains of the 12th-century Guildford Synagogue. While this remains a matter of contention, it is likely to be the oldest surviving former synagogue in Western Europe. The modern-day synagogue, in York Road, was opened in December 1978.

== Culture ==
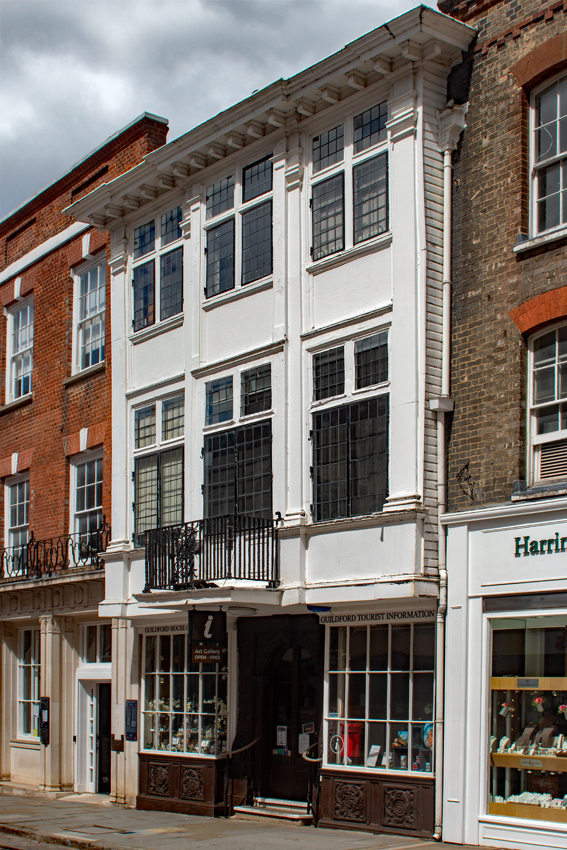
Guildford House art gallery

Guildford House Gallery, in the High Street, is run by Guildford Borough Council. Its art collection includes works of Guildford and the surrounding area, and works by Guildford artists, most notably John Russell.

"And so upon the morn early Sir Launcelot heard mass and brake his fast, and so took his leave of the queen and departed. And then he rode so much until he came to Astolat, that is Guildford."
Thomas Malory linked Guildford with the mythical "Astolat" in the Matter of Britain.

In Sir Thomas Malory's 1470 version of the Arthurian romances, Le Morte d'Arthur, Guildford is identified with Astolat of Arthurian renown. (Note: In Le Morte d'Arthur, Elaine, the "fair maid of Astolat", dies of her unrequited love for Sir Lancelot. Astolat is known as "Shalott" in The Lady of Shalott (first published in 1833), by Alfred, Lord Tennyson.) Continuing the Arthurian connection, there is a local public house, the Astolat. Guildford has been associated with the 1863 novel Alice's Adventures in Wonderland because of its importance in the life of its author, Lewis Carroll. There are several reminders of this connection throughout the town. Guildford Museum has a collection of items belonging to Carroll, see above. In addition to this, sculptor Jean Argent created two full-size bronze sculptures of Alice passing through the Looking-Glass and Alice and the White Rabbit, which can be found in the Castle Grounds and by the River Wey at Millmead respectively. In The Hitchhiker's Guide to the Galaxy by Douglas Adams, the character Ford Prefect, actually an alien from Betelgeuse, claims to be an out-of-work actor from Guildford. Crime at Guildford (1935), a novel by Freeman Wills Crofts, is set in the town.

Guildford has been captured on film in Carry On Sergeant, which was filmed at the former Queens Barracks, and The Omen, a scene from which was filmed at Guildford Cathedral.

The town's principal commercial theatre is the Yvonne Arnaud Theatre, which often shows productions after they have spent time in London's West End. The Electric Theatre opened in 1997 to host performances by musicians and amateur drama groups. It also hosts regular film, family and music festivals as well as comedy, and has a Riverside Cafe Bar and Terrace.

Guildford Shakespeare Company performs in the town, using the bandstand in the castle grounds as the stage in the summer and several churches close to the High Street through the winter.

Guildford has an Odeon cinema multiplex which, in June 2007, was the first cinema in the world to show digital 4K films to the public. Guildford Civic Hall was the town's main arts and entertainment venue until it closed in January 2004. The Civic Hall was replaced by a new venue, G Live, which opened on the same site in September 2011. In 2009 the Mill Studio in Guildford featured the English premiere of the one-woman musical, Estelle Bright, starring actress/singer Sarah Tullamore.

The Guildford Philharmonic Orchestra, founded as the Guildford Municipal Orchestra, received full council funding from 1945 until it was withdrawn in 2012. The orchestra was disbanded in March 2013, with Guildford Borough Council providing a classical music grant to other organisations instead. Singer-songwriter Robyn Hitchcock has sung about the town in "No, I Don't Remember Guildford", a song from his 1999 album Jewels for Sophia.

Stoke Park, Guildford's largest park, is the venue for the GuilFest music festival, which restarted in summer 2024 after a 10-year hiatus. Prior to 2007, the Ambient Picnic was held in Shalford Park, by the River Wey.

Guildford has a model railway club, the Astolat Model Railway Circle, which meets at the National Trust's Dapdune Wharf. They host an annual model railway exhibition at the Sports Park in January.

=== Local media ===
Radio stations Kane 103.7 FM, Greatest Hits Radio Surrey & East Hampshire, GU2 Radio and BBC Radio Surrey are based in Guildford.

The Surrey Advertiser is the local newspaper, a Reach plc publication, which also publishes the online Surrey Live. The offices are in the former Stoke Mill. There is also an independent "online newspaper" The Guildford Dragon NEWS which was founded in 2012.

== Sport ==
=== Venues ===
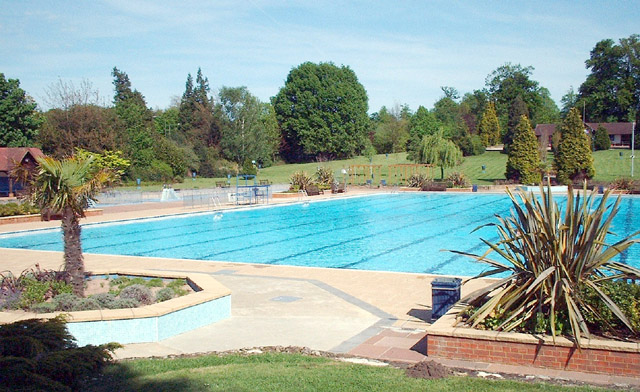
Guildford Lido

The Spectrum Leisure Centre opened in 1993 and replaced the Bedford Road Sports Centre, which closed at the same time. Located on the northern side of Stoke Park, it offers four swimming pools, including a 25-metre lane pool and a leisure pool with eight water slides. The facility also houses an Olympic-sized ice rink and a ten-pin bowling alley.

Guildford Lido, also in Stoke Park, is an Olympic-size, 50-metre outdoor, heated swimming pool. It opened in 1933, and was built as part of a scheme to provide jobs for local workers during the Great Depression. It was rebuilt in 1989 and relined in 2002.

The Surrey Sports Park, owned by the University of Surrey, opened in 2010 and on the Manor Park campus to the west of the town. It has a 50-metre swimming pool, a 12 m (39 ft) climbing wall, as well as squash courts and artificial sports pitches.

=== Professional sports teams ===
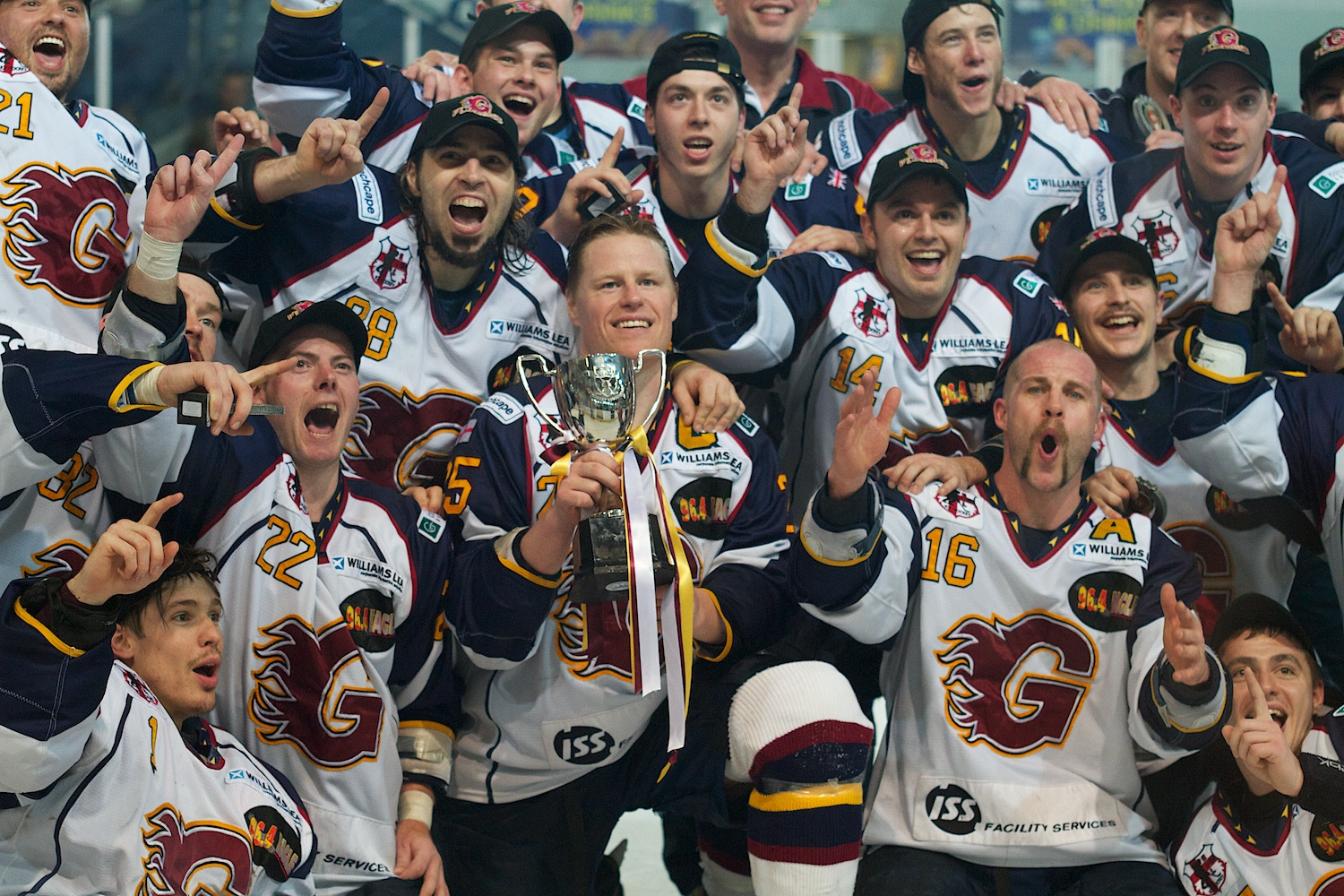
The Guildford Flames celebrate winning the 2011 Playoff Championships

The Guildford Flames ice hockey team is based at the Spectrum Leisure Centre and played its first competitive games in the 1992–93 season. Between 2005 and 2016, the team won the English Premier League four times and, in the 2018–19 season, were Patton Conference champions.

The Surrey Scorchers is a professional basketball club, formed in 2015, following the takeover of the Surrey British Basketball League, by the Surrey Sports Park. Also based at the Surrey Sports Park are the Surrey Storm Netball team. Founded in 2001 as the London Hurricanes, the club moved to Guildford and adopted their current name in 2009.

=== Cricket ===
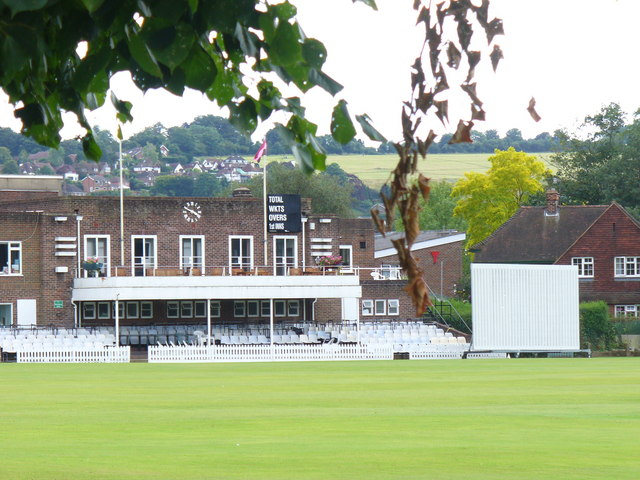
Woodbridge Road cricket ground

Cricket is thought to have evolved from bat and ball games, played by children in southeast England during the Middle Ages. The first written record of the sport is from a witness statement by the Guildford resident and former Royal Grammar School pupil, John Derrick. In 1597 (old style, 1598 modern style), Derrick testified in a court case over the disputed enclosure of wasteland that, as a child, "hee and his fellowes did runne and play there at Creckett and other plaies". (Note: The disputed wasteland, where John Derrick claimed to have played "creckett" as a child, is thought to have been at the junction of North Street and Chertsey Street.)

Guildford Cricket Club was founded in 1866. They play their home matches at the Woodbridge Road ground. Surrey County Cricket Club also play one or two matches a season there. Former players include the England cricketers Martin Bicknell, Rikki Clarke, Ashley Giles, Phil Salt and Ollie Pope.

=== Other sports ===
The current incarnation of Guildford City Football Club was founded in 1996, when the former Burpham F.C. relocated to the Spectrum Leisure Centre and changed its name to A.F.C. Guildford. Nine years later, it was renamed to Guildford United, but soon afterwards became Guildford City F.C.

Guildford International Volleyball Club has won the fourth division of the National Volleyball League.

There are a number of field hockey clubs in the area that compete in the Men's England Hockey League, the Women's England Hockey League, the South East Hockey League and the BUCS league. These are Guildford Hockey Club, Team Surrey Spartans Hockey Club and University of Surrey Hockey Club.

Charlotteville Cycling Club, founded in 1903, is based in Guildford. The club promotes the Guildford Town Centre Cycle Races that take place on the cobbled High Street each July.

Guildford City Boxing Club, (formerly Guildford City ABC), headed by coach, John Edwards is based in Cabell Road in Park Barn. Founded in the 1920s and originally called the Onslow Lions, the boxing club is considered one of the oldest in Surrey. Guildford Crows Aussie Rules FC was founded in 2009 and competes in the AFLGB Southern Division. The club trains at Stoke Park and plays home matches at Effingham and Leatherhead Rugby Club.

Guildford Rowing Club is based in the town and has won at Henley Women's Regatta.

== Notable buildings and landmarks ==
=== Abbot's Hospital ===
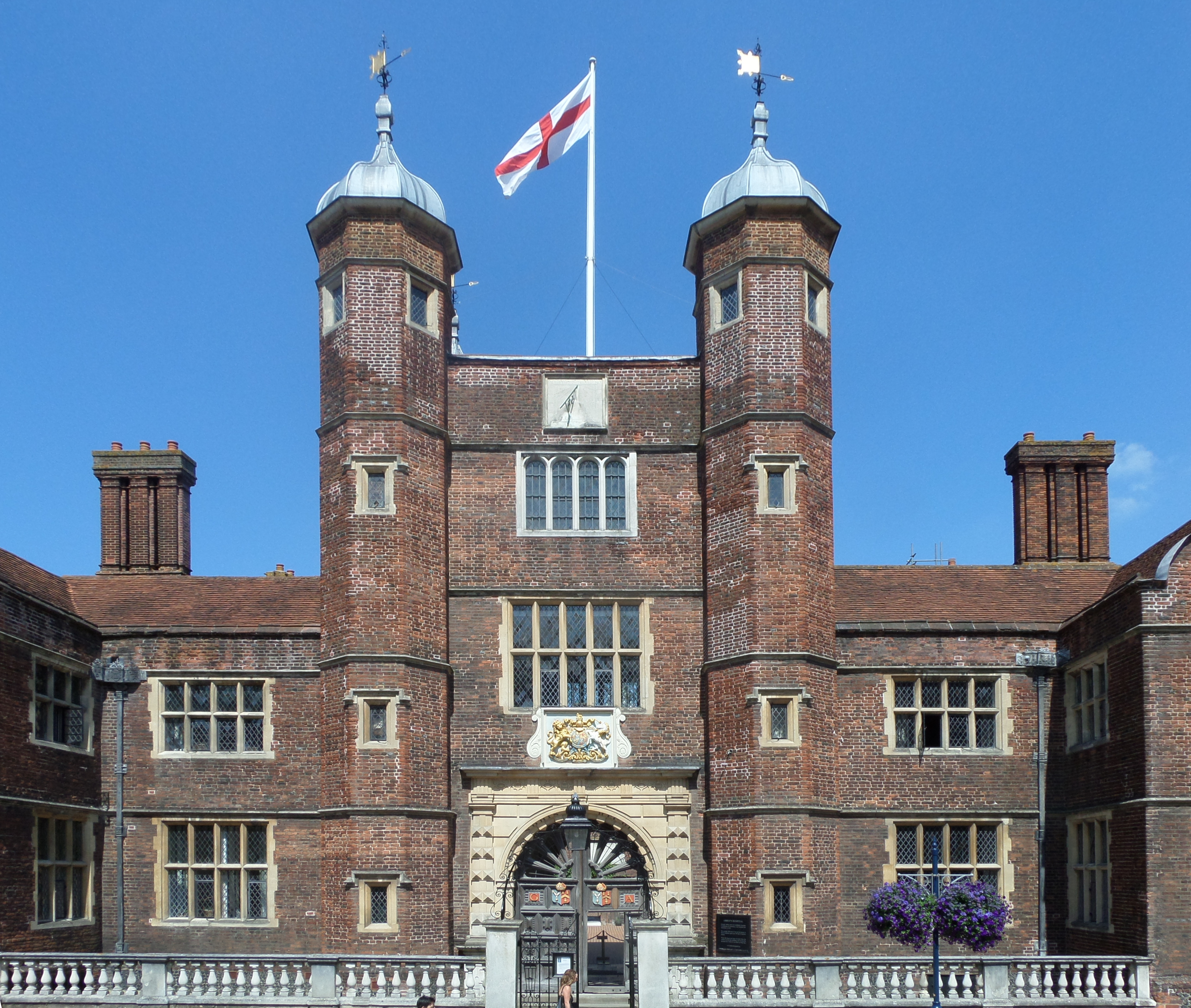
Abbot's Hospital gatehouse

The Hospital of the Holy Trinity, more commonly known as Abbot's Hospital, was founded in 1622 by George Abbot, the Archbishop of Canterbury and a former pupil of the Royal Grammar School. (Note: Construction of Abbot's Hospital began in 1619. Although it was not completed until 1631, parts of the building were in use from 1621.) It was not intended as a place for healing the sick, but instead provided accommodation for single people (initially 12 male and eight female), who had either been born in Guildford or who had lived there at least 20 years. The hospital also included a "manufacture" or workshop for the production of cloth, which was subsidised by the foundation's endowments. (Note: Among the properties which George Abbot gave to endow the hospital were Meriden on the north slopes of Leith Hill, two farms at Merrow, the Manor of West Wantley near Storrington and woodland at St Catherine's Hill.) Initially linen was woven, but from 1638 wool was produced instead. In 1656, the trustees successfully applied to the Court of Chancery to close the workshop and the funds were redirected to grants for the poor.

The hospital is constructed of dark red brick and is built around a central, rectangular courtyard. The four-storey gatehouse, on the High Street, faces Holy Trinity Church. Many of the rooms have panelling dating from the early 17th century and the chapel, in the northwest corner, retains its original wooden seating. The building was extended and refurbished in the 1980s, to improve the standard of the living accommodation.

=== Dapdune Wharf ===
Dapdune Wharf has been the main boatyard for the River Wey Navigation since the waterway was completed in 1653. Over the summer months, the National Trust runs a variety of trips on the Wey Navigation, starting from here, where there is a visitor centre.

=== Guildford Institute ===
The Guildford Institute was founded in March 1834 as the Guildford Mechanics' Institute to promote "useful knowledge among the working classes." Its current premises, on North Street, were opened in 1892 and its activities were funded by a membership subscription. (Note: The Grade II-listed Institute building on North Street was originally constructed in 1880 as The Royal Arms Coffee Tavern and Temperance Hotel. It was extended northwards, along Ward Street, in 1892.) Following the Second World War, the Institute entered a period of decline, but its fortunes revived in the 1970s with a new management team and, from 1982, a 26-year partnership with the University of Surrey. (Note: The University of Surrey was a trustee of the Guildford Institute from 1982 until 2008.) A redevelopment project was launched in 2012 and was completed the following year. In 2022, the institute offers a wide range of courses, a lending library and archive, a vegan restaurant and aims to provide an educational, cultural and social hub for the local community.

=== Guildford Museum ===
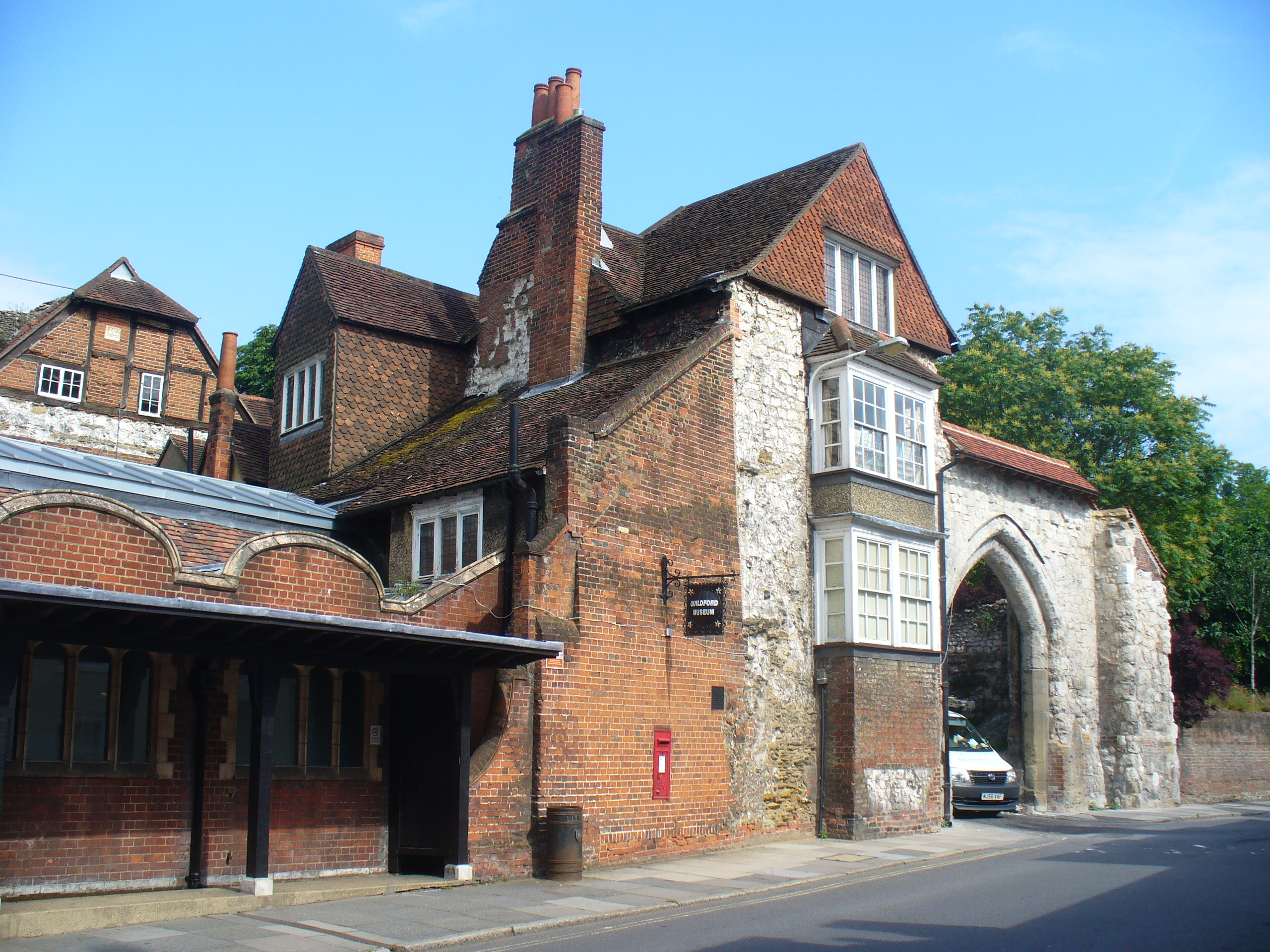
Guildford Museum, Castle Arch

The Guildford Museum was founded by the Surrey Archaeological Society, which relocated to Castle Arch House from Southwark in 1898. The building, thought to have been constructed c. 1630, incorporates part of the 13th-century castle gateway. Although the public had been allowed limited access to the Society's collections since its relocation to Guildford, the museum was not formally opened until 1907.

A new gallery, constructed in the Arts and Crafts style, was opened in 1911 to house objects donated by the horticulturalist, Gertrude Jekyll. In 1927–28, the adjacent early 19th century townhouse, 48 Quarry Street was acquired and was converted to house the Muniment Room. The borough council took over the running of the museum in 1933. In 2021, the collection numbers around 75,000 items and includes archaeological finds, textiles and clothing, and artefacts illustrating the social and industrial history of the town.

=== The Guildhall ===
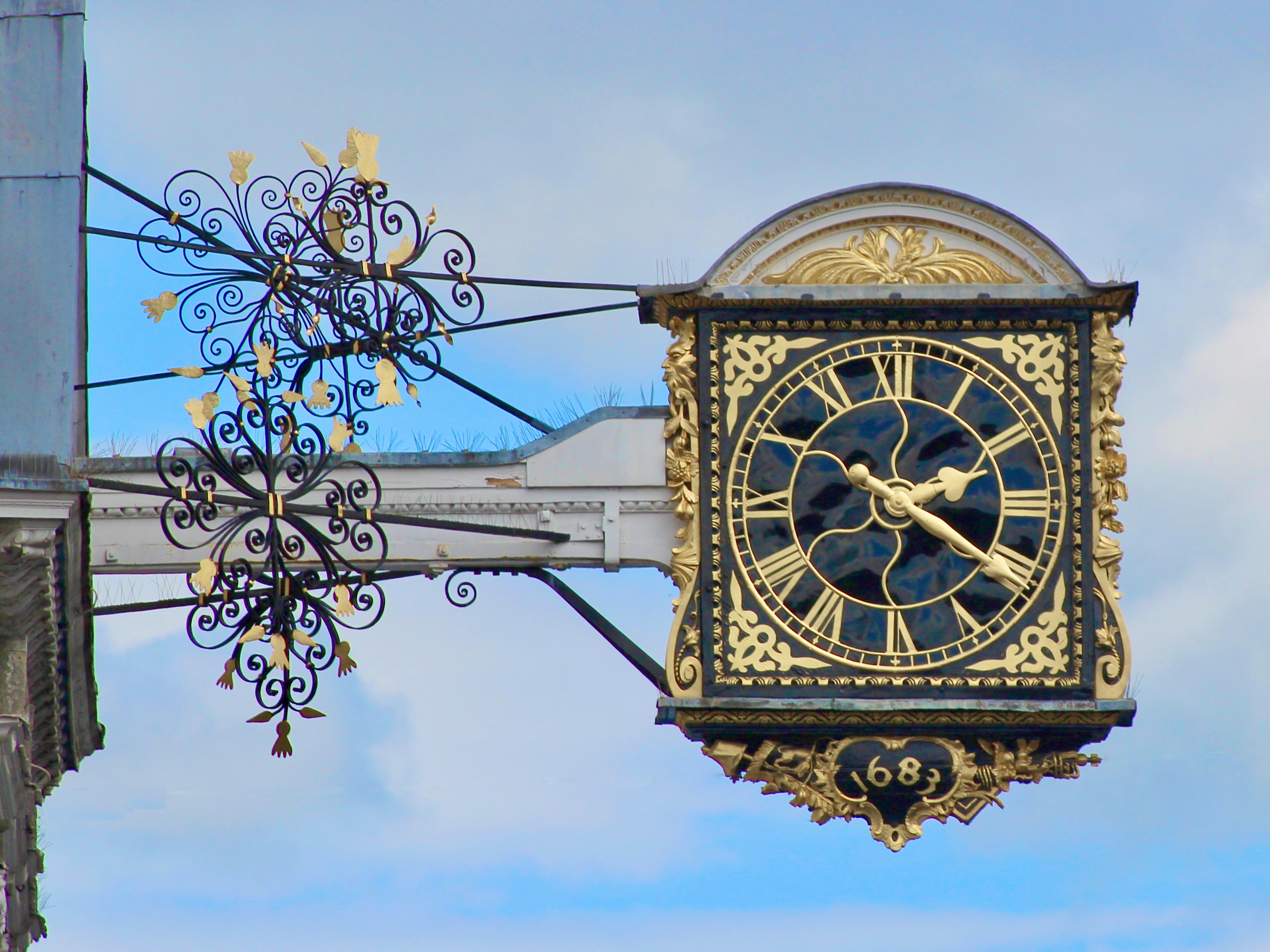
The outer case of the Guildhall clock is dated 1683.

The guild in Guildford was formed in the late 14th century shortly after 1366, when Edward III issued the fee farm grant, enabling the town to become self-governing in exchange for a yearly rent of £10. The first mention of a guildhall is from later in Edward's reign, when repairs were carried out at some point before the king's death in 1377. The current building is thought to have been constructed c. 1550 and was extended northwards in 1589. The council chamber and the exterior façade, facing the High Street, were created in 1683, funded by public subscription. The clock case dates from the same year, but the mechanism inside may be up to a century older. (Note: During the Second World War, the Guildhall clock was removed and is thought to have been hidden in the crypt of Guildford Cathedral.) The original bell, which now stands in the entrance hall, was replaced in 1931 and may have previously been installed in St Martha's Church.

=== The Spike ===
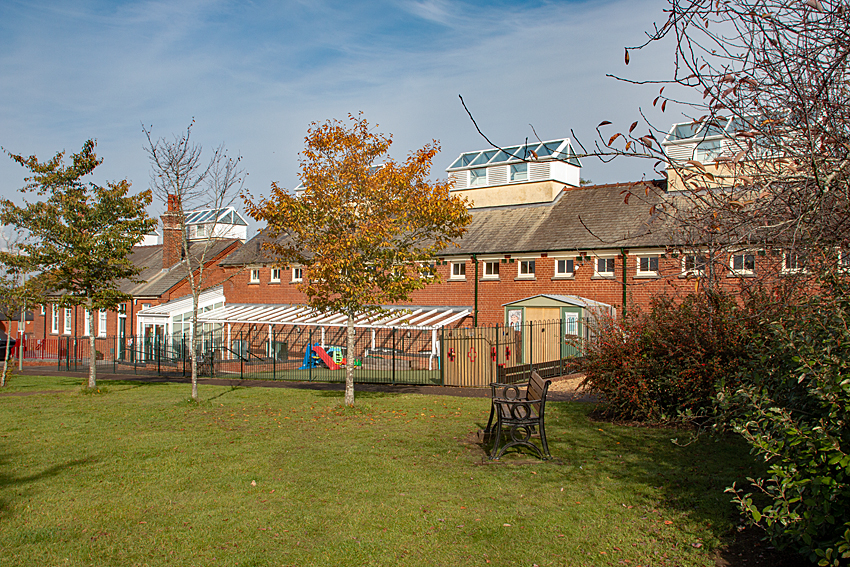
The Spike, Guildford

The building now known as The Spike, was constructed in 1906 as the Guildford Union Workhouse Casuals Ward. It was used to house any vagrants found on the streets of the town, who were to be detained for two nights and compelled to undertake hard labour. (Note: Typical tasks given to vagrants detained at The Spike included stone breaking, oakum picking and wood chopping.) Four of the original thirteen stone breaking cells survive. Following the repeal of the Poor Laws in 1929, the building continued to be used as a hostel for the homeless. In the mid-1960s, it became the archive and document store for St Luke's Hospital, which had been built on the rest of the former workhouse site. Since 2008, the building has functioned as joint community and heritage centre.

=== The Undercroft ===
The Undercroft, beneath 72–74 High Street, is one of six cellars in the town centre that survive from the late-Medieval period. It is open twice a week.

== Parks and open spaces ==
=== Stoke Park ===
Stoke Park is a large park on the edge of the town centre, with sports facilities and play areas. It was donated to the town in 1925 by Lord Onslow.

=== Allen House Grounds ===
Allen House, to the north of the Upper High Street, was built in the 17th century and took its name from Anthony Allen, who owned the property in the early 18th century. The house and its grounds were given to the Royal Grammar School in 1914 and the site was used to train local volunteer soldiers during the First World War. The building was used as a teaching annex by the school until 1964, when it was demolished to make way for a new classroom complex. The rest of the site was purchased by the borough council and is known today as the Allen House Grounds. Following a refurbishment in 2009, the site includes a formal garden, inspired by the poem Jabberwocky, by Lewis Carroll, a multi-sports court and a putting green.

=== Pewley Down ===
Pewley Down, located on a hill southeast of the town centre, is a Local Nature Reserve owned and managed by the borough council. The 9.5-hectare (23-acre) area of chalk grassland provides a habitat for six species of orchid, and 26 species of butterfly were recorded there in 2010.

== Notable people ==
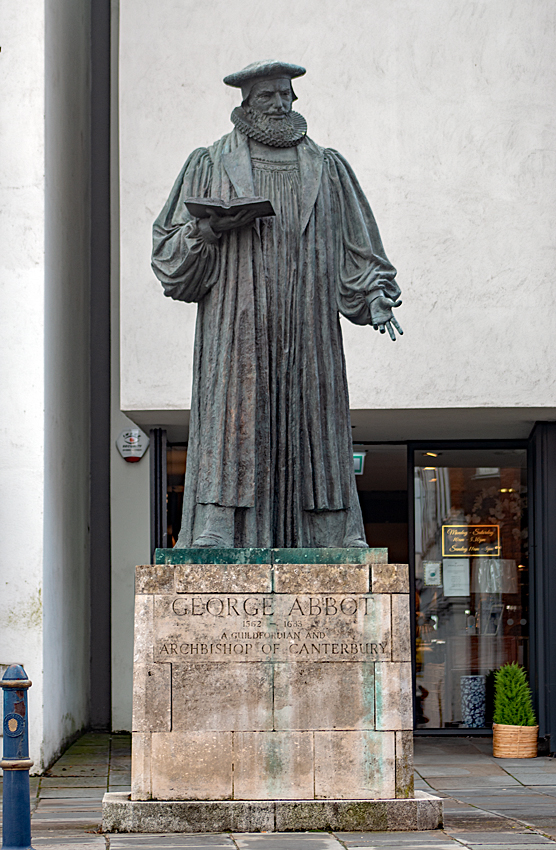
Statue of George Abbot, High Street (Note: The statue of George Abbot, at the east end of the High Street, was unveiled in 1993 by Robert Runcie, a former Archbishop of Canterbury. Cast in bronze and mounted on a Portland stone pedestal, it was designed by the sculptor, Faith Winter.)

- George Abbot (1562–1633) Archbishop of Canterbury – was born in Guildford and lived in the town until 1580, when he became a student at Balliol College, Oxford University. He founded Abbot's Hospital in 1619. (Note: Abbot's brothers, Robert Abbot (1560–1611) and Maurice Abbot (1565–1642), Bishop of Salisbury and Lord Mayor of London respectively, were also born and brought up in Guildford.)
- Joan Armatrading (b. 1951) musician – has lived in Guildford since at least 2012.
- John Russell (1745–1806) portrait artist – was born in Guildford and lived in the town until 1760.
- Thomas Moore (1821–1887) botanist – was born in Stoke-next-Guildford and lived in the town until 1839
- Lewis Carroll (1832–1898) author (notably of Alice's Adventures in Wonderland), mathematician and photographer – died in Guildford at the home of his sisters. He had bought the house for them in 1868 and spent Christmas there annually.
- Edward Carpenter (1844–1934) poet and philosopher – moved to Guildford after the First World War and lived in the town until his death.
- Roger Fry (1866–1934) artist and art critic – lived in Chantry View Road from 1909 to 1919
- Mildred Cable (1878–1952) Protestant missionary – was born in Sydenham Road, Guildford and was educated at Guildford High School
- Leonard Colebrook (1883–1967) bacteriologist – was born in Guildford and was educated at the Royal Grammar School until 1896
- Alan Turing (1912–1954) mathematician and computer scientist – his parents bought a house in Ennismore Avenue and between 1927 and 1931, he stayed there during the school holidays.
- Stuart Wilson (b. 1946) actor – was born in Guildford
- Mike Rutherford (b. 1950) musician – was born in Guildford
- Kazuo Ishiguro (b. 1954) novelist – lived in Guildford as a child, having moved to the town at the age of six.

== See also ==
- List of public art in Surrey

== Bibliography ==
- Alexander, Mary (2006). "With ramparts crown'd" The early history of Guildford Castle. Guildford: Guildford Museum. ISBN 978-0-95-532510-6.
- Alexander, Mary (2013). Holy Trinity Guildford: A Georgian Parish. Guildford: Guildford History Press. ISBN 978-0-95-716211-2.
- Alexander, Matthew (1980). Vintage Guildford. Hendon: Hendon Publishing Company.
- Alexander, Matthew (2001). Guildford, a short history. Godalming: Ammonite Books. ISBN 978-1-86-986602-0.
- Altham, H. S. (1962). A history of cricket : Volume 1 (to 1914). London: George Allen & Unwin. ASIN B0014QE7HQ.
- Bruton, Jean (2005). Girls in Blue : An illustrated history of Tormead School. London: James & James. ISBN 978-1-90-402203-9.
- Chamberlin, E.R. (1982). Guildford (2nd ed.). Chichester: Phillimore. ISBN 978-0-85-033457-9.
- Chapman Davies, Helen (2004). The Guildford Union Workhouse and the Vagrants' Casual Ward. Guildford: Guildford Museum. ISBN 978-0-95-437531-7.
- Clark, Lyn (1999). Stoke next Guildford : a short history. Chichester: Phillimore. ISBN 978-1-86-077122-4.
- Collyer, Graham; Rose, David (1998). Images of Guildford. Derby: Breedon Books. ISBN 1-85983-120-6.
- Collyer, Graham; Rose, David (1999). Guildford : The war years (1939-1945). Derby: Breedon Books. ISBN 978-1-85-983177-9.
- Cotton, Jonathan; Crocker, Glenys; Graham, Audrey, eds. (2004). Aspects of archaeology and history in Surrey. Guildford: Surrey Archaeological Society. ISBN 978-0-95-414603-0.
- Corke, Shirley (1990). Guildford : A pictorial history. Chichester: Phillimore. ISBN 978-0-85-033774-7.
- Crocker, Glenys (1999). Surrey's Industrial Past. Guildford: Surrey Industrial History Group. ISBN 978-0-95-239188-3.
- Davies, Paul M. (1993). South west Surrey Hospitals 1859-1991. Guildford: Surrey Health Authority. ISBN 978-0-95-081921-1.
- Dines, H.G.; Edmunds, F.H.; Chatwin, C.P. (1929). The geology of the country around Aldershot and Guildford : Explanation of one-inch geological sheet 286, new series. London: British Geological Survey. Archived from the original on 2 June 2022.
- Ellison, R. A.; Williamson, I. T.; Humpage, A. J. (2002). Geology of the Guildford district : a brief explanation of the geological map Sheet 285 Guildford. Keyworth: British Geological Survey. ISBN 978-0-85-272409-5.
- Field, Marion (2022). The story of Guildford (2nd ed.). Andover: Phillimore. ISBN 978-0-75-099899-4.
- Gallois, R.W.; Edmunds, F.H. (1965). The Wealden District. British Regional Geology. British Geological Survey. ISBN 978-0-11-884078-1.
- Gover, J.E.B.; Mawer, A.; Stenton, F.M. (1969). The place-names of Surrey. Cambridge: Cambridge University Press.
- Hadfield, Charles (1969). The Canals of South and South-East England. David and Charles. ISBN 978-0-71-534693-8.
- Hindle, Brian (2001). Roads and tracks for historians. Chichester: Philimore. ISBN 978-1-86-077182-8.
- Hutchinson, Philip (2009). Guildford past and present. Stroud: History Press. ISBN 978-0-75-245127-5.
- Lewis, S., ed. (1848). A Topographical Dictionary of England. London. Archived from the original on 11 July 2022.
- Malden, H.E., ed. (1911). A History of the County of Surrey. Vol. 3. London: Victoria County History.
- Manning, Owen; Bray, William (1804). The history and antiquities of the County of Surrey. Vol. I. London: White, John.
- Middleton-Stewart, Geraldine (2001). Surrey Police : A pictorial history 1851-2001. Guildford: Surrey Police.
- Mills, A.D. (2003). Oxford Dictionary of British Place Names. Oxford: Oxford University Press. ISBN 978-0-19-852758-9.
- Mitchell, Vic; Smith, Keith (1985). Woking to Portsmouth. Midhurst: Middleton Press. ISBN 978-0-90-652025-3.
- Mitchell, Vic; Smith, Keith (1988). Woking to Southampton. Midhurst: Middleton Press. ISBN 978-0-90-652055-0.
- Mitchell, Vic; Smith, Keith (1990). Branch lines around Effingham Junction. Midhurst: Middleton Press. ISBN 978-0-90-652074-1.
- Morgan, Gavin (1992). The Guildford Guy riots : being an exact description of the terrible disturbances in the county town of Surrey. London: Northside Books. ISBN 978-0-95-202050-9.
- Newman, Stan (2002). Guildford : The changing face. Derby: Breedon Books. ISBN 978-1-85-983313-1.
- Olausson, Lena; Sangster, Catherine (2006). Oxford BBC guide to pronunciation. Oxford: Oxford University Press. ISBN 978-0-19-280710-6.
- Oppitz, Leslie (1988). Surrey railways remembered. Newbury: Countryside. ISBN 978-1-85-306005-2.
- Palliser, David M. (2006). Towns and Local Communities in Medieval and Early Modern England. Variorum Collected Studies. Abingdon: Routledge. ISBN 978-0-86-078974-1.
- Reilly, John M. (1980). Reilly, John M (ed.). Twentieth-century crime and mystery writers. London: Palgrave Macmillan. doi:10.1007/978-1-349-81366-7. ISBN 978-1-34-981368-1.
- Reynolds, Kev (2017b). North Downs Way (3rd ed.). Milnethorpe: Cicerone. ISBN 978-1-85-284861-3.
- Rose, David (2000). Memory Lane : Guildford and District. Derby: Breedon Books. ISBN 978-1-85-983194-6.
- Rose, David (2001). Guildford : Our town. Derby: Breedon Books. ISBN 978-1-85-983262-2.
- Rose, David (2014). Guildford : Remembering 1914-18. Great War Britain. Cheltenham: The History Press. ISBN 978-0-75-096027-4.
- Rose, David (2016). Guildford Pubs. Stroud: Amberley. ISBN 978-1-44-565719-6.
- Rose, David; Parke, Bernard (2007). Guildford : Remember when?. Derby: Breedon Books. ISBN 978-1-85-983588-3.
- Rose, David; Parke, Bernard (2015). Guildford History Tour. Stroud: Amberley Publishing. ISBN 978-1-44-565442-3.
- Sankey, Anne (1993). Stoughton, Guildford : people and places. A. Sankey. ISBN 978-0-95-225561-1.
- Spalding, Frances (1980). Roger Fry, art and life. Berkeley: University of California Press. ISBN 978-0-52-004126-4.
- Taylor, Brian (1999). Abbot's Hospital, Guildford. Guildford: St. Thomas's Trust. ISBN 978-0-95-201404-1.
- Vine, P.A.L (1973). London's lost route to the sea (3rd ed.). Newton Abbot: David and Charles. ISBN 978-0-71-536203-7.
- Vine, P.A.L (1987). Surrey Waterways. Midhurst: Middleton Press. ISBN 978-0-90-652051-2.
- Wakeford, Iain (1987). Woking 150 : The history of Woking and its railway. Woking: Mayford & Woking District History Society. ISBN 978-0-95-026751-7.
