= Sunspot (disambiguation) =

A sunspot is a dark region that periodically appears on the surface of the Sun.

Sun spot, Sunspot, or Sunspots may also refer to:

== Art, entertainment, and media ==
- Sunspot (character), a Marvel Comics superhero
- "Sunspots" (song), a 1984 song by Julian Cope
- Sunspots (TV series), a 1974–75 Canadian television series
- "Sunspot", a song by Moby, B-side to the 1999 song "Bodyrock"
- "Sunspots", a song by Modest Mouse from their 1997 EP The Fruit That Ate Itself
- "Sunspots", a song by Nine Inch Nails from the 2005 album With Teeth
- "Sunspots", an episode of Static Shock

== Science and technology ==
- Sunspot Solar Observatory, a solar telescope in the United States
- Sunspot (Trojan horse), computer malware
- Sun SPOT, a wireless sensor network device created by Sun Microsystems
- Sun spots or solar lentigo, skin blemishes
- SunSpot, the codename for the multi-display ATI Eyefinity Technology

== Other ==
- Sunspot, New Mexico, an unincorporated place in the United States
- Sunspots (economics), the economic term referring to a random variable
- Sunspottery, ascribes sunspots and their cycles as causes for various cyclic phenomena
