= Statist (disambiguation) =

Statist may refer to:

- Anything pertaining to the political ideology of Statism
- Statists (Belgium), a conservative political faction during the Brabant Revolution
- The Statist, a British magazine that closed in 1967
