= Fabroni =

Fabroni is a surname. Notable people with the surname include:

- Angelo Fabroni (1732–1803), Italian biographer and historian
- Carlo Agostino Fabroni (1651–1727), Italian Roman Catholic cardinal
