= Statue of George Washington (Massachusetts State House) =

1815 statue by William Rush in Philadelphia

George Washington
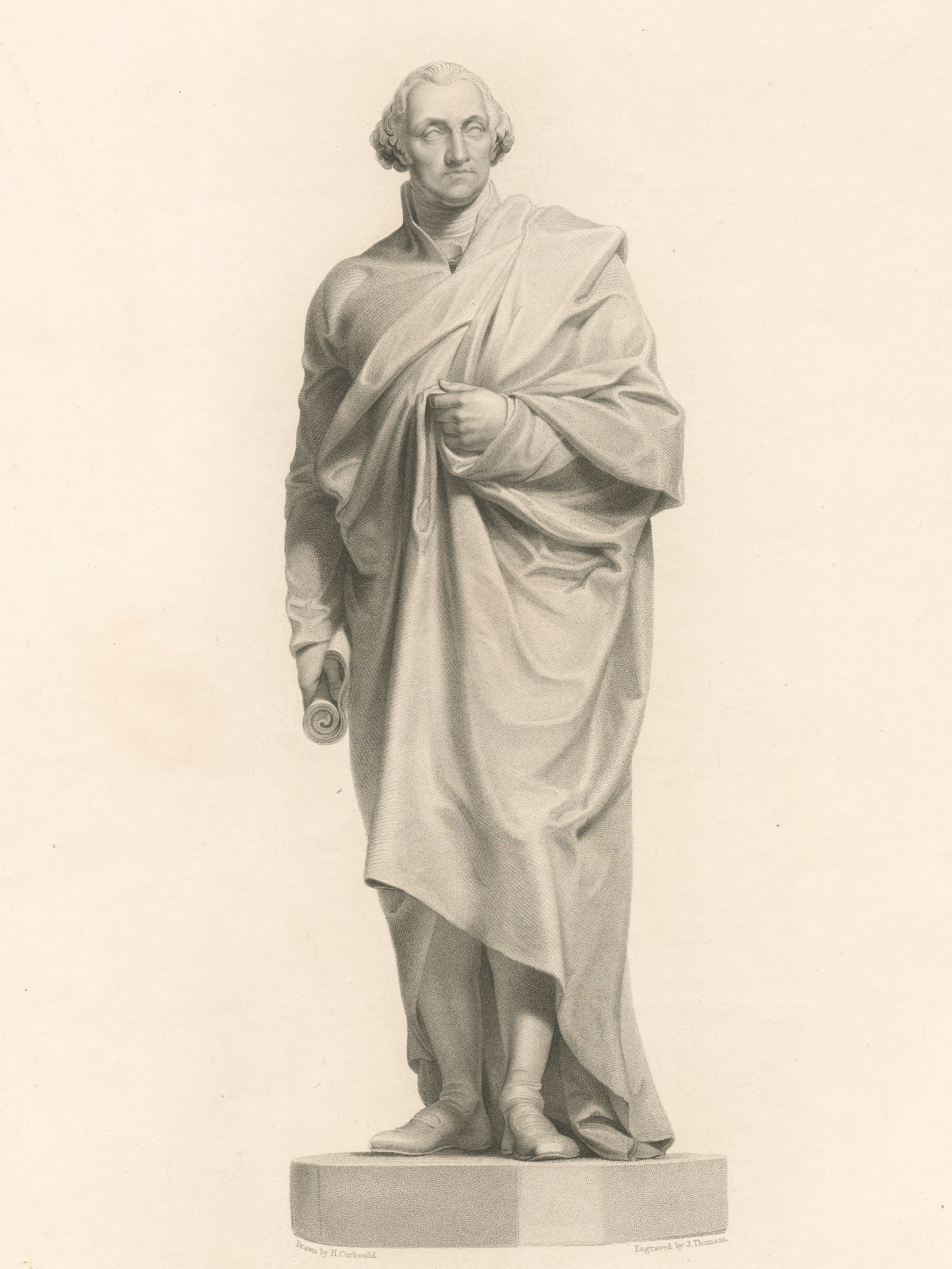
- George Washington by Sir Francis Chantrey
- Artist: Francis Chantrey
- Year: 1826
- Medium: Marble
- Dimensions: 2.2 m (7.3 ft)
- Location: Massachusetts State House, Boston, Massachusetts, United States; 42°21′32″N 71°3′50″W

George Washington is a life-size marble statue of George Washington by the English sculptor Sir Francis Chantrey created in 1826 and dedicated in November 1827. It depicts Washington as a Roman Senator and is in Doric Hall of the Massachusetts State House in Boston, Massachusetts.

The Statue depicts Washington wearing his typical general's Uniform under a Roman-style toga. The sculptor created him in this regalia to highlight Washington's role as a statesman.

An empty pedestal sits beneath the statue. Chantry believed that Washington would be recognizable to all, and that his piece did not need a name plate.

== See also ==
- 1826 in art
- Cultural depictions of George Washington
- List of memorials to George Washington
- List of statues of George Washington
