= William Roscoe =

British banker, lawyer and politician (1753–1831)

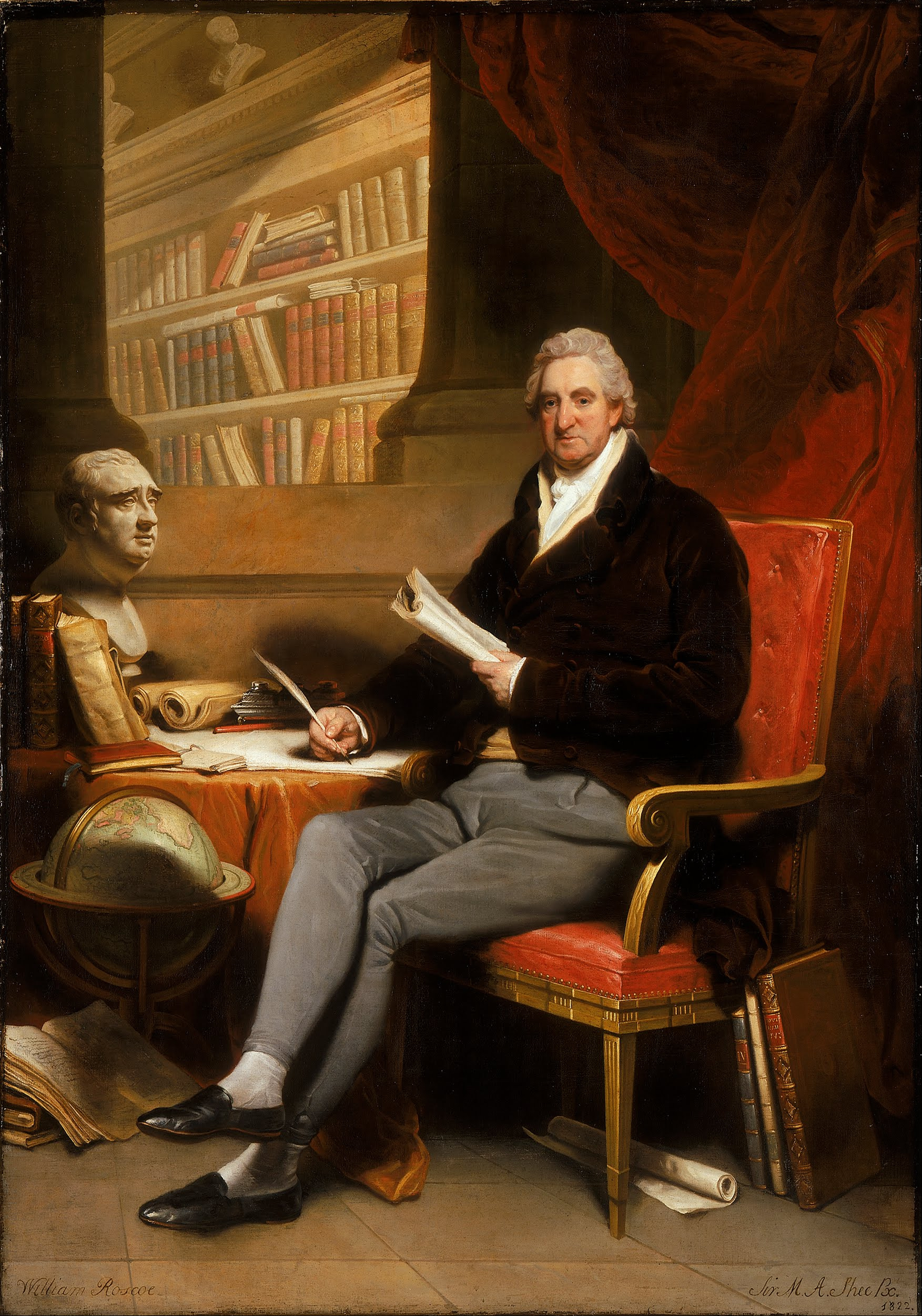
- Portrait of William Roscoe by Martin Archer Shee, 1815–1817 (which is on display at the Walker Art Gallery, Liverpool).
- Born: 8 March 1753; Liverpool, England
- Died: 30 June 1831 (aged 78); Liverpool, England
- Occupations: historian, abolitionist, art collector, politician, lawyer, banker, botanist and writer
- Writing career
- Notable work: The Butterfly's Ball, and the Grasshopper's Feast

William Roscoe (8 March 1753 – 30 June 1831) was a British banker, lawyer and politician. He is best known as one of England's first abolitionists, and as the author of the poem for children The Butterfly's Ball, and the Grasshopper's Feast. In his day he was also respected as a historian and art collector, as well as a botanist and miscellaneous writer. The standard author abbreviation Roscoe is used to indicate this person as the author when citing a botanical name.

== Early life ==
Roscoe was born in Liverpool, where his father, a market gardener, kept a public house called the Bowling Green at Mount Pleasant. Roscoe left school at the age of twelve, having learned all that his schoolmaster could teach. He assisted his father in the work of the garden, but spent his leisure time on reading and study. Later, he wrote:

This mode of life gave health and vigour to my body, and amusement and instruction to my mind; and to this day I well remember the delicious sleep which succeeded my labours, from which I was again called at an early hour. If I were now asked whom I consider to be the happiest of the human race, I should answer, those who cultivate the earth by their own hands.

At fifteen he began to look for a suitable career. A month's trial of bookselling was unsuccessful, and in 1769 he was articled to a solicitor. Although a diligent student of law, he continued to read the classics, and made the acquaintance with the language and literature of Italy which was to dominate his life.

== Career ==
In 1774, he went into business as a lawyer, and in 1781 married Jane, second daughter of William Griffies, a Liverpool tradesman; they had seven sons and three daughters. At the time of his marriage, he was living with his father on Lord Street. Roscoe had the courage to denounce the trans-Atlantic slave trade in his native town, where, at that time, a significant amount of the wealth came from slavery. Roscoe was a prominent Unitarian. His outspokenness against the slave trade meant that abolitionism and Unitarianism were linked together in the public mind. He was a member of Renshaw Street Unitarian Chapel.

In 1796, Roscoe gave up legal practice, and toyed with the idea of going to the bar. Between 1793 and 1800, he paid much attention to agriculture, and helped to reclaim Chat Moss, near Eccles, Lancashire. He also succeeded in restoring to good order the affairs of a banking house in which his friend William Clark, then resident in Italy, was a partner. This led to his introduction to the business, which eventually proved disastrous.

Roscoe was elected Member of Parliament for Liverpool in 1806, but the House of Commons was not for him, and at the dissolution in the following year he stood down. During his brief stay however, he was able to cast his vote in favour of the successful abolition of the slave trade.

In the early 1800s, he led a group of Liverpool botanists who created the Liverpool Botanic Garden as a private garden, initially located near Mount Pleasant, which was then on the outskirts of the city. In the 1830s the garden was moved to Wavertree Botanic Gardens; remnants of the collection can still be found in the walled garden at Croxteth Hall.

The commercial troubles of 1816 brought into difficulties the banking house with which he was connected, and forced the sale of his collections of books and pictures. Dr S.H. Spiker, the king of Prussia's librarian, visited Roscoe at this difficult time. Roscoe said he still desired to write a biography of Erasmus but lacked both leisure and youth. The project was never carried out. Around this time Roscoe was asked to investigate the claims of the blind girl Margaret M'Avoy, who was said to be able to read using her fingers, at the request of Sir Joseph Banks. Roscoe concluded that her amazing abilities were due to the fact that she was not blind.

After five years struggling to discharge the liabilities of the bank, the action of some creditors forced the partners into bankruptcy in 1820. For a time Roscoe was in danger of arrest, but ultimately he received an honourable discharge. On the dispersal of his library, the volumes most useful to him were secured by friends and placed in the Liverpool Athenaeum of which he had been a founding member in 1797. The sum of £2,500 was also invested for his benefit.

Roscoe was also closely associated with the formation of the Liverpool Royal Institution in Colquitt Street, first as chairman of the General Committee and subsequently as its first President.

== Retirement ==
Having now resigned commercial pursuits entirely, he found a pleasant task in the arrangement of the great library at Holkham Hall, the property of his friend Thomas Coke.

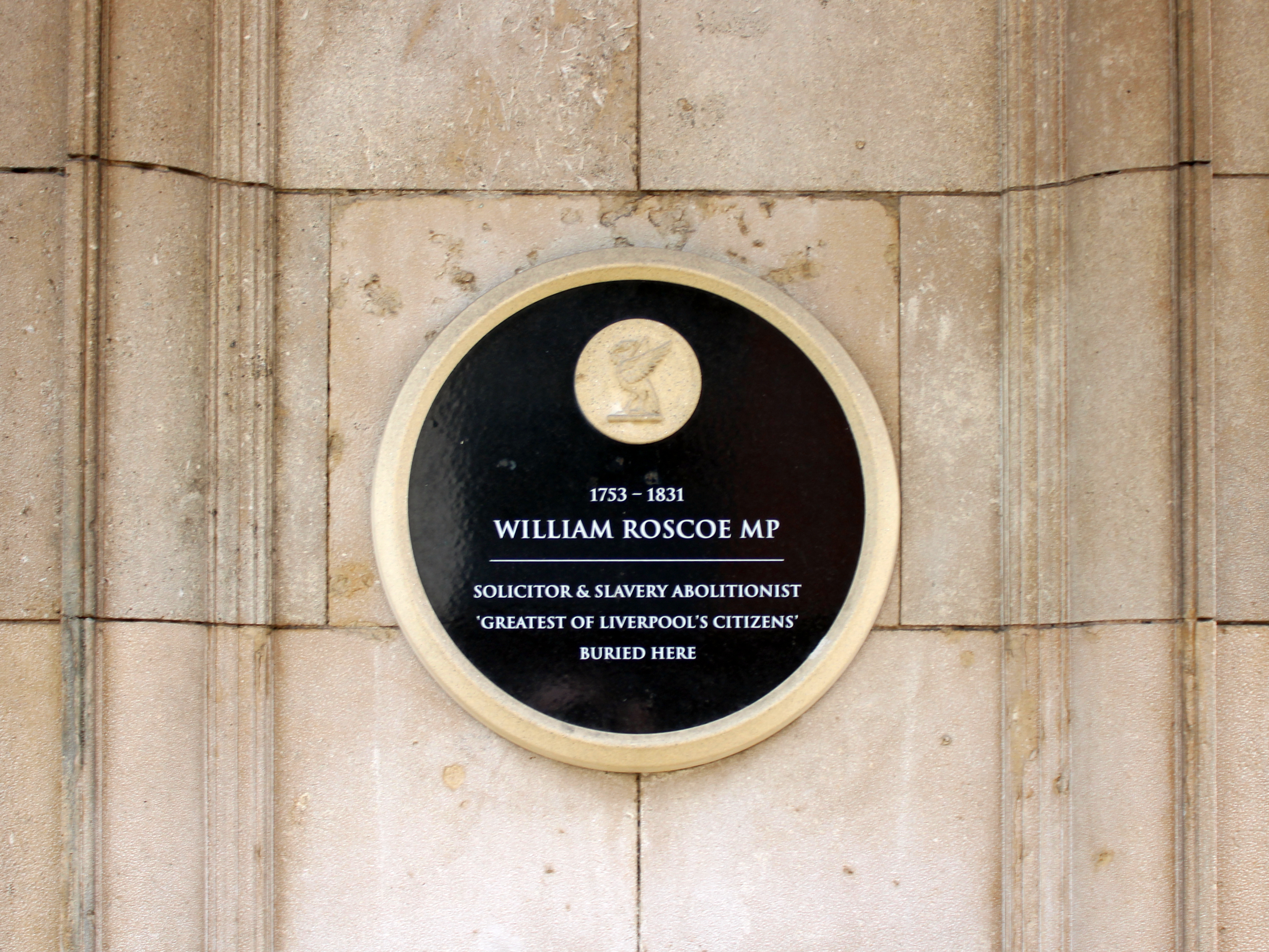
Roscoe plaque, roughly locating burial place of William Roscoe in Roscoe Gardens, Mount Pleasnt

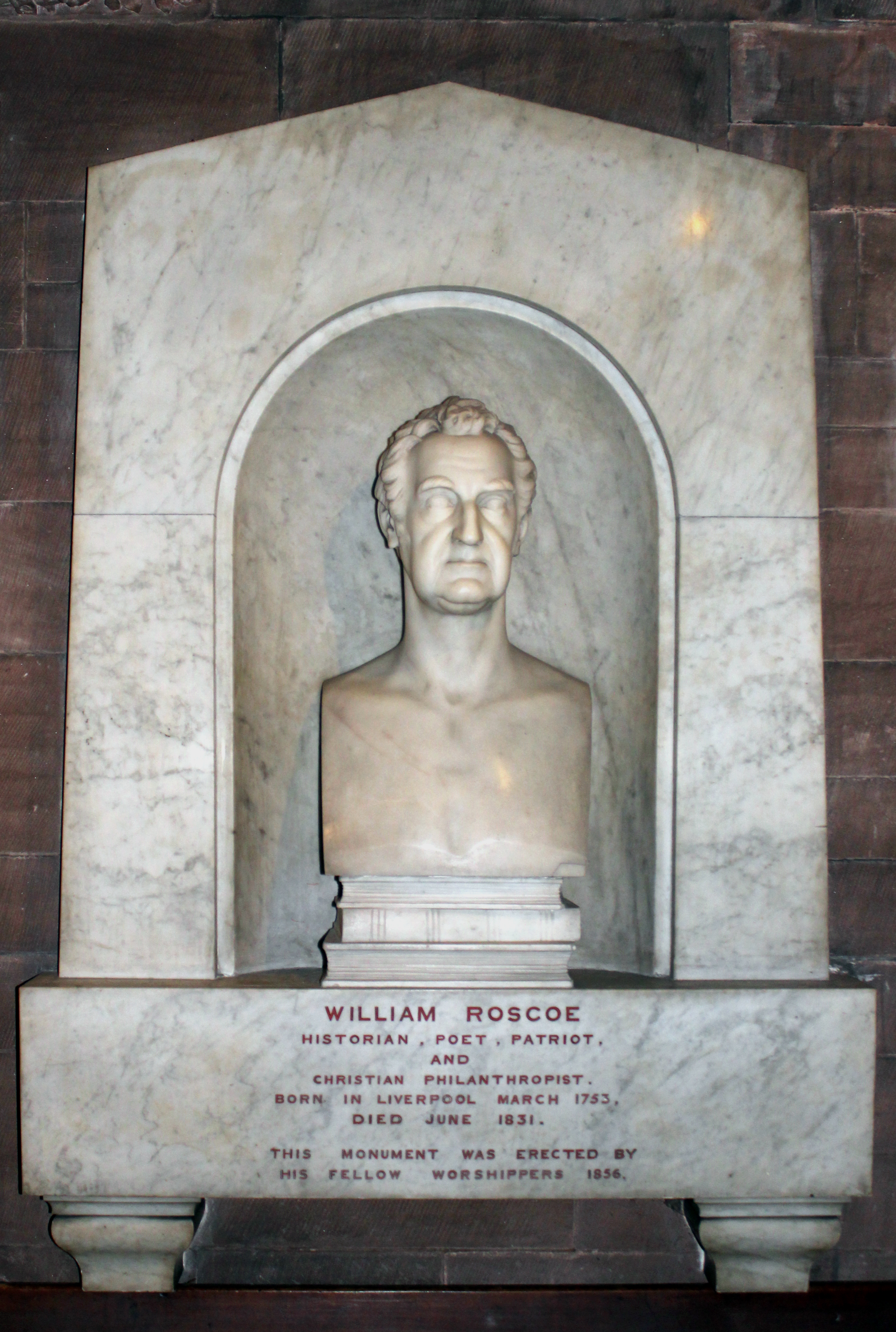
William Roscoe's memorial, relocated to Ullet Road Unitarian Church carved by John Gibson

In the 1820s, he started to publish his important work on the reorganisation of the Zingiberales order of flowering plants. This was called Monandrian Plants of the Order Scitamineae: Chiefly Drawn from Living Specimens in the Botanical Gardens at Liverpool. It was originally issued in 15 parts and then 150 copies of the complete set were published. The Scitamineaen order (nowadays Zingiberales), almost exclusively tropical in origin, includes the canna lilies, arrowroot, ginger, and turmeric. Roscoe provides 1 or 2 pages of text for each of 112 specimens, giving the plant's binomial, a technical description followed by a fuller more general description, and ending with "observations" (notes on where the plant is from, who has described it previously, and often when the drawing of the plant was made) and "references" (brief explanations of the small numbered dissections found on each plate).

== Legacy ==
Roscoe showed considerable moral courage as well as devotion to study. He had many friends. Posterity is not likely to endorse the verdict of Horace Walpole, who thought Roscoe the best of our historians, but his books on Lorenzo de' Medici and Pope Leo X remained important contributions to historical literature.

Many of his collection of paintings, dispersed in auctions during his financial troubles, remained in Liverpool and later reached the Walker Art Gallery, which in 2015 had extra labels marking them out as once part of Roscoe's collection. Roscoe was a relatively early collector of the "Italian Primitives".

He died on 30 June 1831 and was buried in the Unitarian Grave Yard at Mount Pleasant, a memorial plaque indicates the approximate spot of his grave.

== Works ==
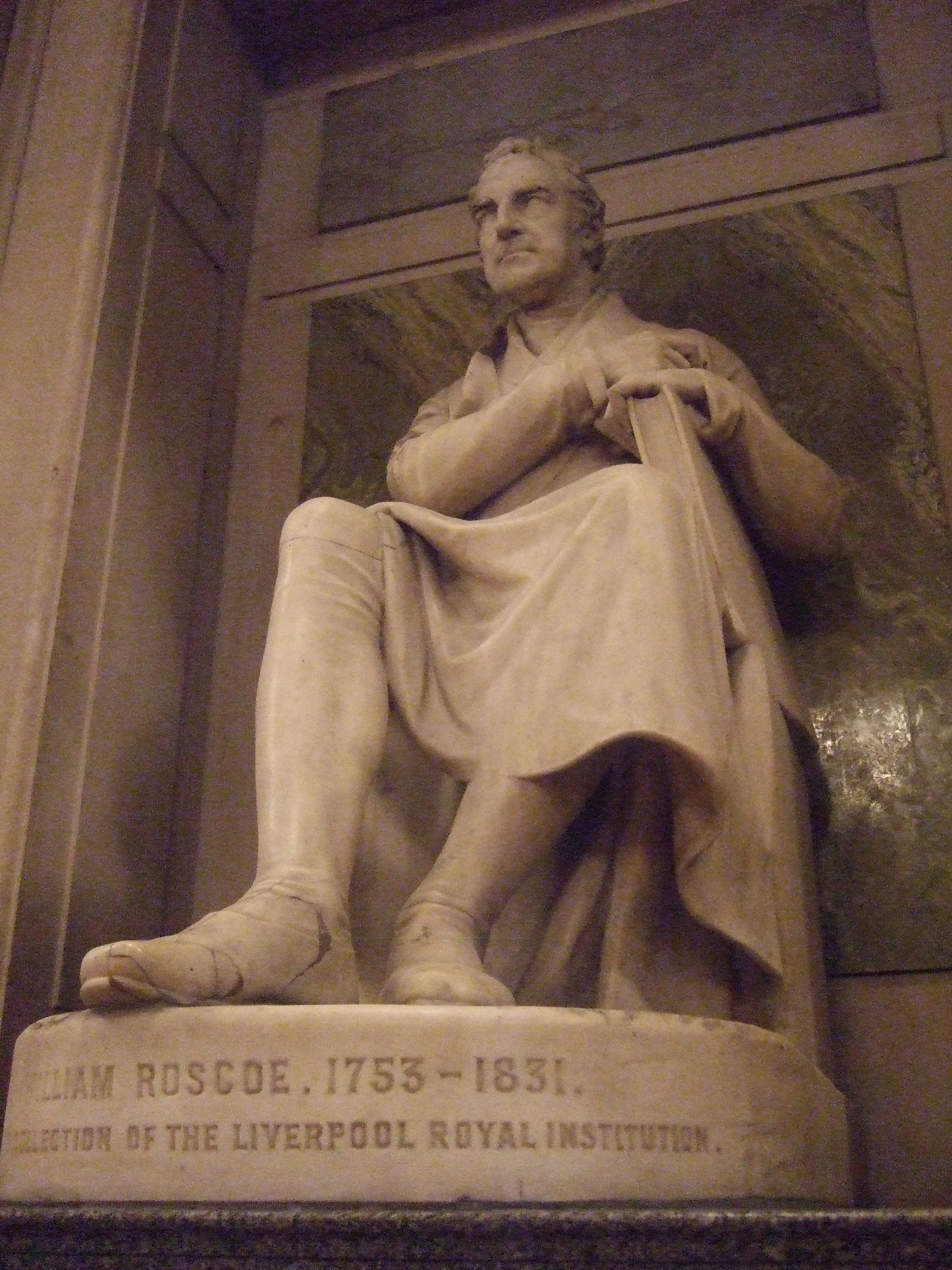
Statue of William Roscoe at St. George's Hall, Liverpool by Chantrey

His poem, Mount Pleasant, was written when he was sixteen, and together with other verses, now forgotten, won the esteem of critics.

He wrote a long poem published in two parts called The Wrongs of Africa (1787–1788), and entered into a controversy with an ex-Roman Catholic priest called Fr Raymond Harris, who tried to justify the slave trade through the Bible (and was generously paid for his efforts by Liverpool businessmen involved with the slave trade). Roscoe also wrote a pamphlet in 1788 entitled "A General View of the African Slave Trade". Roscoe was also a political pamphleteer, and like many other Liberals of the day hailed the promise of liberty in the French Revolution.

Meanwhile, he had pursued his Italian studies, and had carried out research, which resulted in his Life of Lorenzo de' Medici, which appeared in 1796, and gained him a reputation among contemporary historians. It was often reprinted, and translations in French, German and other languages show that its popularity was not confined to Britain. Angelo Fabroni, who had intended to translate his own Latin life of Lorenzo, abandoned the idea and persuaded Gaetano Mecherini to undertake an Italian version of Roscoe's work. Roscoe's translation of Luigi Tansillo's Nurse appeared in 1798, and went through several editions. It is dedicated in a sonnet to his wife, who had practised the precepts of the Italian poet.

The Life and Pontificate of Leo the Tenth appeared in 1805, and was a natural sequel to his previous work of history. The new work, whilst it maintained its author's fame, did not meet with so favourable a reception as the Life of Lorenzo. It was frequently reprinted, and the insertion of the Italian translation in the Index Librorum Prohibitorum did not prevent its circulation even in the Papal States.

He wrote the Sonnet on Parting with his Books on the 1816 sale of his library. In 1822 he issued an appendix of illustrations to his Lorenzo and also a Memoir of Richard Robert Jones of Aberdaron, a remarkable self-taught linguist. The year 1824 was memorable for the death of his wife and the publication of his edition of the works of Alexander Pope, which involved him in a controversy with William Lisle Bowles. His versatility was shown by the appearance of a folio monograph on the Monandrian Plants, which was published in 1828. The last part came out after his recovery from a stroke.

In addition to these, Roscoe wrote tracts on penal jurisprudence and contributed to the Transactions of the Royal Society of Literature and of the Linnean Society. The first collected edition of his Poetical Works was published in 1857, and is sadly incomplete, omitting, with other verses known to be from his pen, the Butterfly's Ball, a fantasy, which has charmed thousands of children since it appeared in 1807. Other verses are in Poems for Youth, by a Family Circle (1820).

== Family ==
Roscoe and his wife had seven sons and three daughters, including William Stanley Roscoe (1782–1843), a poet, Thomas Roscoe (1791–1871), translator from Italian, and Henry (1800–1836), a legal writer who wrote his father's biography. Henry's wife, Maria Roscoe, née Fletcher (1798–1885), wrote a biography of Vittoria Colonna, and their son Henry Enfield Roscoe (1833–1915) was a chemist and vice-chancellor of the University of London. Daughter Mary Anne was known as a poet by her married name Mary Anne Jevons, and was the mother of William Stanley Jevons. Roscoe's daughter-in-law, Margaret Roscoe was one of the illustrators for his publication Monandrian Plants of the Order Scitamineae: Chiefly Drawn from Living Specimens in the Botanical Gardens at Liverpool.

== Artistic recognition ==
A bust of Roscoe dated 1816 by John Gibson is held in the Royal Institution in Liverpool.

== See also ==
- List of abolitionist forerunners

Parliament of the United Kingdom
Preceded by Banastre Tarleton; Isaac Gascoyne	Member of Parliament for Liverpool; 1806–1807; With: Isaac Gascoyne	Succeeded by Banastre Tarleton; Isaac Gascoyne
