= Herbert Stanley Jevons =

English political scientist (1875–1955)

Herbert Stanley Jevons (8 October 1875 – 27 June 1955) was an English political scientist.

Born in Manchester, Jevons was the son of economist and mathematician William Stanley Jevons. He was professor of economics and political science at University College of South Wales and Monmouthshire which is a former name of Cardiff University. He was also the first Head of Department of Economics at University of Allahabad. Jevons was the first Secretary of the Abyssinian Association and the first treasurer of the Anglo-Ethiopian Society. He started the Indian Journal of Economics. He was also the first president of Indian Economic Association.

== Second Industrial Revolution ==
In 1931, Jevons published his hypothesis that the advanced industrial countries of the world were at that time experiencing a Second Industrial Revolution whereby the way secondary industries were organised was being transformed by he use of inductive methods in the study of industry, both at an overall and individual level. This gathering of facts and their application in developing planning processes, he argued, would transform society in a way comparable to the first Industrial Revolution. He predicted differences in how economic planning would be transformed depending on whether this planning was carried out on the basis of free competition or monopoly and in the latter case whether this was in the context of private or public ownership.
