= George Paish =

British economist (1867–1957)

Sir George Paish
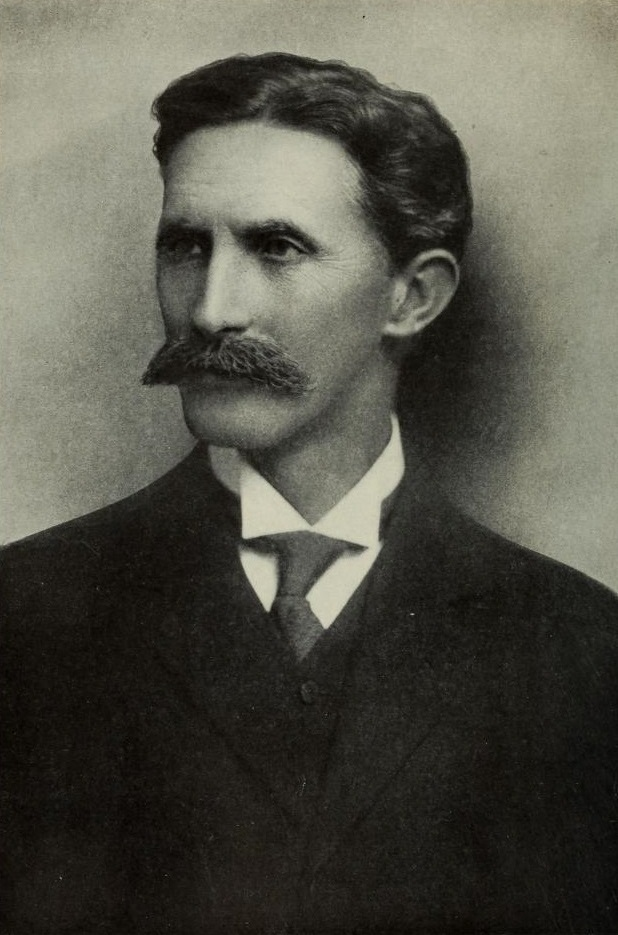
- Portrait of Sir George Paish (c. 1914)
- Born: 7 November 1867; Horsham, Sussex, England
- Died: 1 May 1957 (aged 89); Stoke Poges, Buckinghamshire, England
- Occupations: Journalist and Economist

Sir George Paish (7 November 1867 – 1 May 1957) was a British liberal economist of international renown, author of The Defeat of Chaos (1941), as well as Railways in Great Britain (1904), and co-author of Road To Prosperity in 1927. He advocated the free market prior to the First World War, and was at one point advisor to the head of the British Treasury. He also served for a time as co-president of the Anglo-Ethiopian Society.

He was the assistant editor of The Statist magazine from 1894 to 1900 and later became the editor.

== Family ==
Paish was born in Horsham, Sussex, on 7 November 1867, the son of Robert and Jane Paish; his father was a coachman. He married Emily Mary Whitehead on 24 March 1894, and they had five sons. One of the sons was Frank Walter Paish, also an economist. His wife died in 1933, and Paish married again on 30 September 1936 to Anita Carolyn Rouse. Paish died on 1 May 1957 in a nursing home at Wexham in Buckinghamshire.

== Politics ==
He was active for the Liberal Party and stood three times for them as a parliamentary candidate, in 1922 and 1935. In June 1936, he was elected to serve on the Liberal Party Council.

== Honours and awards ==
On 1 July 1912 Paish was conferred the honour of a Knighthood in the King's birthday honours.

== Books ==
Paish was the author of the following books:

- British Railway Position (1902)
- Railways of Great Britain (1904)
- Railways of the United States (1913)
- Capital Investments in Other Lands (1909 and 1910)
- Saving and Social Welfare (1911)
- The Economics of Reparation (1921)
- The Road to Prosperity (1927)
- World Economic Suicide (1929)
- The Way to Recovery (1931)
- The Way Out (1937)
- The World Danger (1939)
- The Defeat of Chaos (1941)
- World Restoration (1944)
- Sound Currency (1946)
- The Future of the £ (1948)
- The World of Danger (1949)

== See also ==
- Wall Street crash of 1929
- Manchester Exchange (UK Parliament constituency)
- Glasgow Central (UK Parliament constituency)
- Anglo-Ethiopian Society
