= Francis Leggatt Chantrey =

English sculptor (1781–1841)

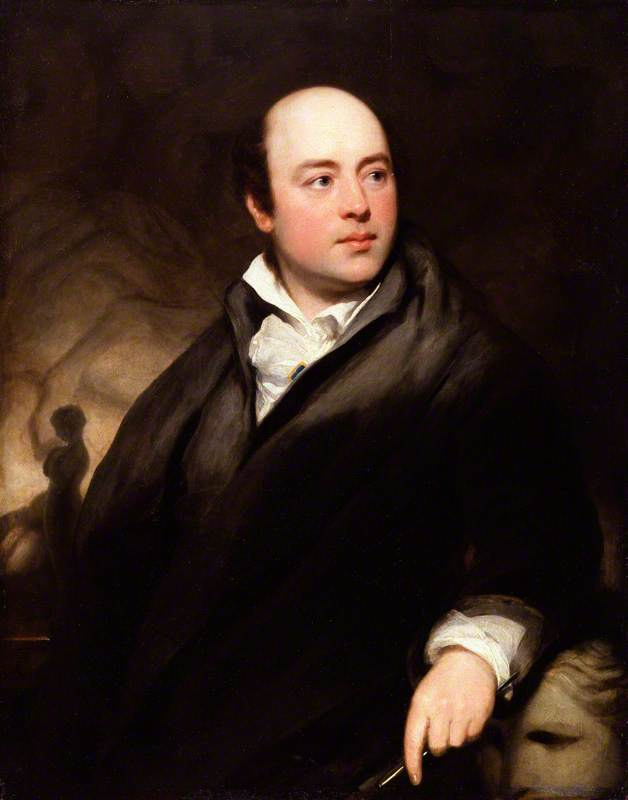
- Portrait of Francis Leggatt Chantrey by Thomas Phillips, 1818
- Born: 7 April 1781; Jordanthorpe, Derbyshire, England
- Died: 25 November 1841 (aged 60); London, England
- Occupation: Sculptor

Sir Francis Leggatt (Note: Sometimes spelled Legatt) Chantrey RA (7 April 1781 – 25 November 1841) was an English sculptor. He became the leading portrait sculptor in Regency era Britain, producing busts and statues of many notable figures of the time. Chantrey's most notable works include the statues of King George IV (Trafalgar Square); King George III (Guildhall), and George Washington (Massachusetts State House). He also executed four monuments to military heroes for St Paul's Cathedral, London. He left the Chantrey Bequest (or Chantrey Fund) for the purchase of works of art for the nation, which was available from 1877 after the death of his widow.

== Life ==
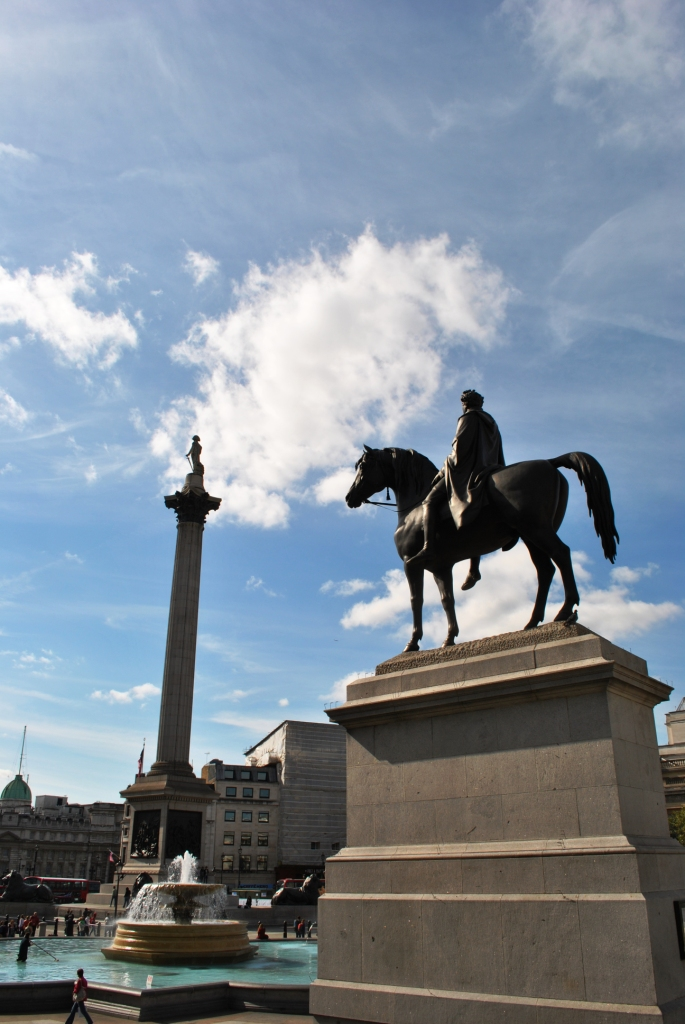
King George IV by Chantrey, Trafalgar Square, London

Chantrey was born at Jordanthorpe near Norton (then a Derbyshire village, now a suburb of Sheffield), where his family had a small farm. His father, who also dabbled in carpentry and wood-carving, died when Francis was twelve; and his mother remarried, leaving him without a clear career to follow. At fifteen, he was working for a grocer in Sheffield, when, having seen some wood-carving in a shop-window, he asked to be apprenticed as a carver instead, and was placed with a woodcarver and gilder called Ramsay in Sheffield.

At Ramsay's house he met the draughtsman and engraver John Raphael Smith who recognised his artistic potential and gave him lessons in painting, and was later to help advance his career by introducing him to potential patrons.

In 1802, Chantrey paid £50 to buy himself out of his apprenticeship with Ramsay and immediately set up a studio as a portrait artist in Sheffield, which allowed him a reasonable income.

For several years he divided his time between Sheffield and London, studying intermittently at the Royal Academy Schools. In the summer of 1802, he travelled to Dublin, where he fell very ill, losing all his hair. He exhibited pictures at the Royal Academy for a few years from 1804, but from 1807 onwards devoted himself mainly to sculpture.

Asked later in life, as a witness in a court case, whether he had ever worked for any other sculptors, he replied: "No, and what is more, I never had an hour's instruction from any sculptor in my life".

His first recorded marble bust was one of the Rev. James Wilkinson (1805–06), for Sheffield parish church. His first imaginative sculpture, a head of Satan was shown at the Royal Academy in 1808.

In 1809, the architect Daniel Asher Alexander commissioned him to make four monumental plaster busts of the admirals Adam Duncan, 1st Viscount Duncan, Richard Howe, Earl Howe, John Jervis, 1st Earl of St Vincent and Horatio Nelson for the Royal Naval Asylum at Greenwich, for which he received £10 each. Three of them were shown at the Royal Academy that year.

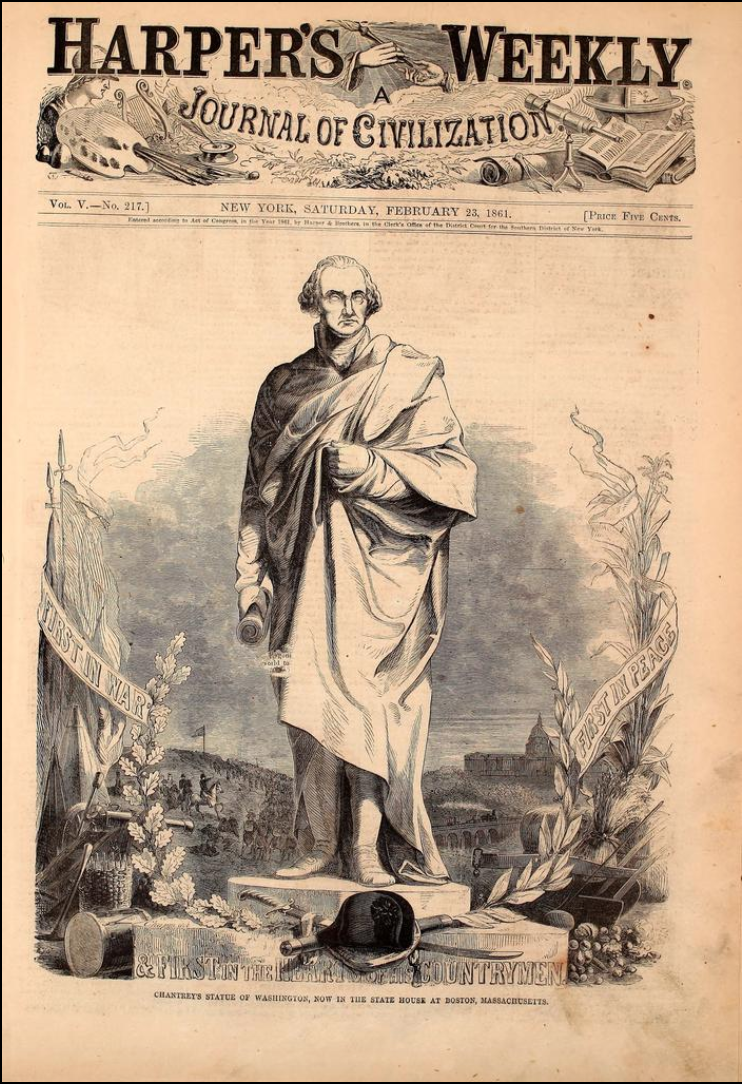
George Washington, Massachusetts State House by Sir Francis Chantrey, Harper's Weekly, 26 February 1861

On 23 November 1809, he married his cousin, Mary Ann Wale at St Mary's Church, Twickenham. By this time he was settled permanently in London, His wife brought £10,000 into the marriage, which allowed Chantrey to pay off his debts, and for the couple to move into a house at 13 Eccleston Street, Pimlico, (recorded as Chantrey's address in the Royal Academy catalogues from 1810). He also bought land to build two more houses, a studio and offices.

In 1811, he showed six busts at the Royal Academy.The subjects included John Horne Tooke and Sir Francis Burdett, both of whom were political figures he greatly admired, his early mentor John Raphael Smith, and Benjamin West. Joseph Nollekens placed the bust of Tooke between two of his own, and the prominence given to it is said to have had a significant influence on Chantrey's career. In the wake of the exhibition he received commissions amounting to £12,000. In 1813 he was able to raise his price for a bust to a hundred and fifty guineas, and in 1822 to two hundred.

He visited Paris in 1814, and again in 1815, this time with his wife, Thomas Stothard, and D. A. Alexander, visiting the Louvre where he especially admired the works of Raphael and Titian. In 1819 he went to Italy, accompanied by the painter John Jackson, and an old friend named Read. In Rome he met Bertel Thorvaldsen and Antonio Canova, getting to know the latter especially well.

In 1828 Chantrey set up his own foundry in Eccleston Place, not far from his house and studio, where large-scale works in bronze, including equestrian statues, could be cast.

== Working practices ==
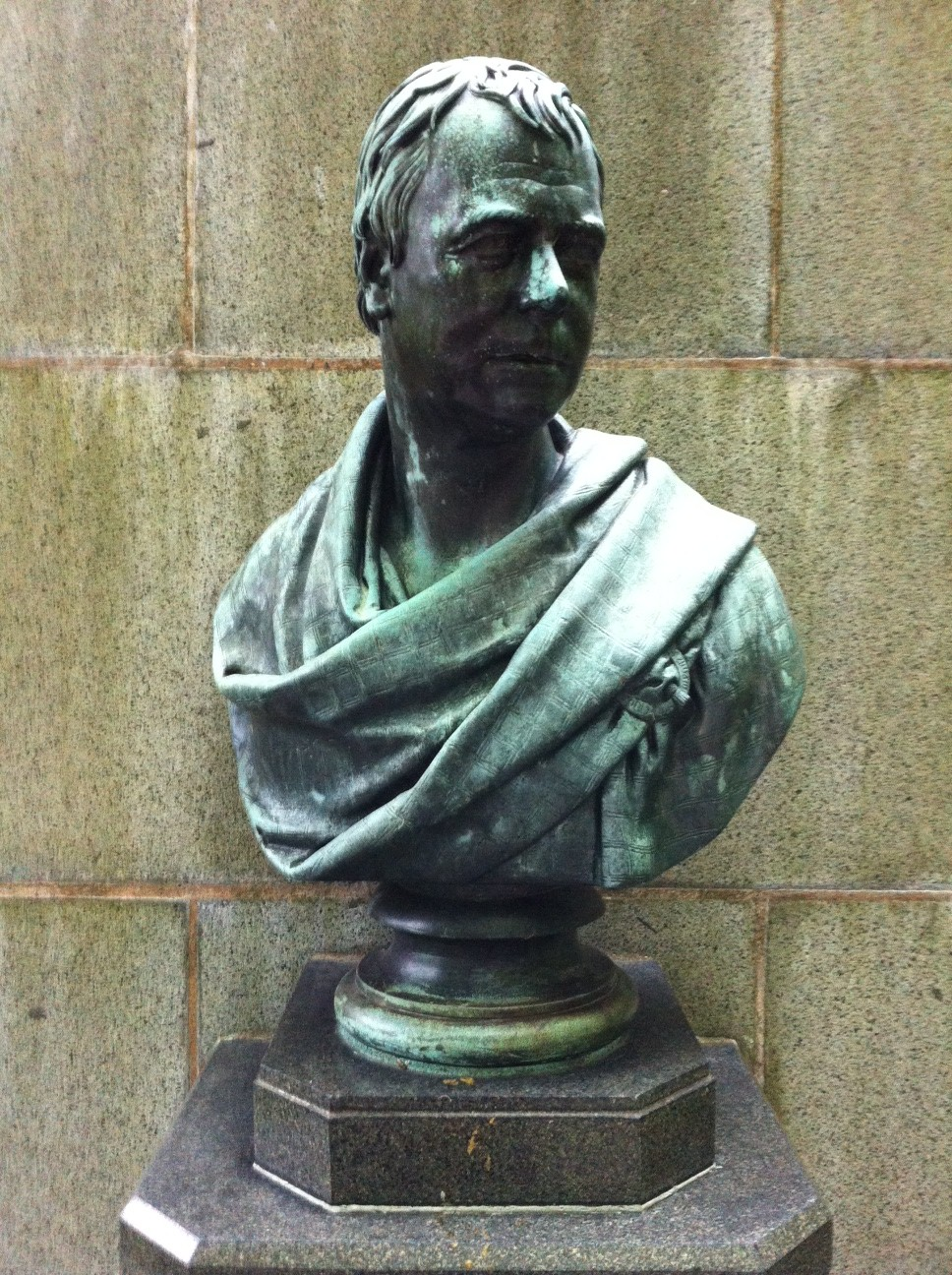
Sir Walter Scott by Sir Francis Chantrey (1832), Victoria Park, Halifax, Nova Scotia

Chantrey developed a procedure of making a portrait sculpture in which he would begin by making two life-sized drawings of his sitter's head, one full-face and one in profile, with the aid of a camera lucida. His assistants would then make a clay model based on the drawings, to which Chantrey would add the finishing touches in front of the sitter. A plaster cast would be made of the clay model, and then a marble replica made of that. Allan Cunningham and Henry Weekes were his chief assistants, and made many of the works produced under Chantrey's name. The debilitating effects of heart disease made him even more reliant on assistants in the last few years of his life.

== Style ==
Chantrey was rare among the leading sculptors of his time in not having visited Italy at a formative stage in his career. A writer in Blackwood's Edinburgh Magazine in 1820 saw him as liberating English sculpture from foreign influence:

Those who wish to trace the return of English sculpture from the foreign artificial and allegorical style, to its natural and original character—from cold and conceited fiction to tender and elevated truth, will find it chiefly in the history of Francis Chantrey and his productions.

More recently, Margaret Whinney wrote that Chantrey "had a great gift for characterisation, his ability to render the softness of flesh was much admired" and that "though compelled by the fashion of the day to produce, on occasions, classicizing works, his robust common sense and his enormous talent is better displayed in works which combine an almost classical simplicity of form with naturalism in presentation".

== Works ==
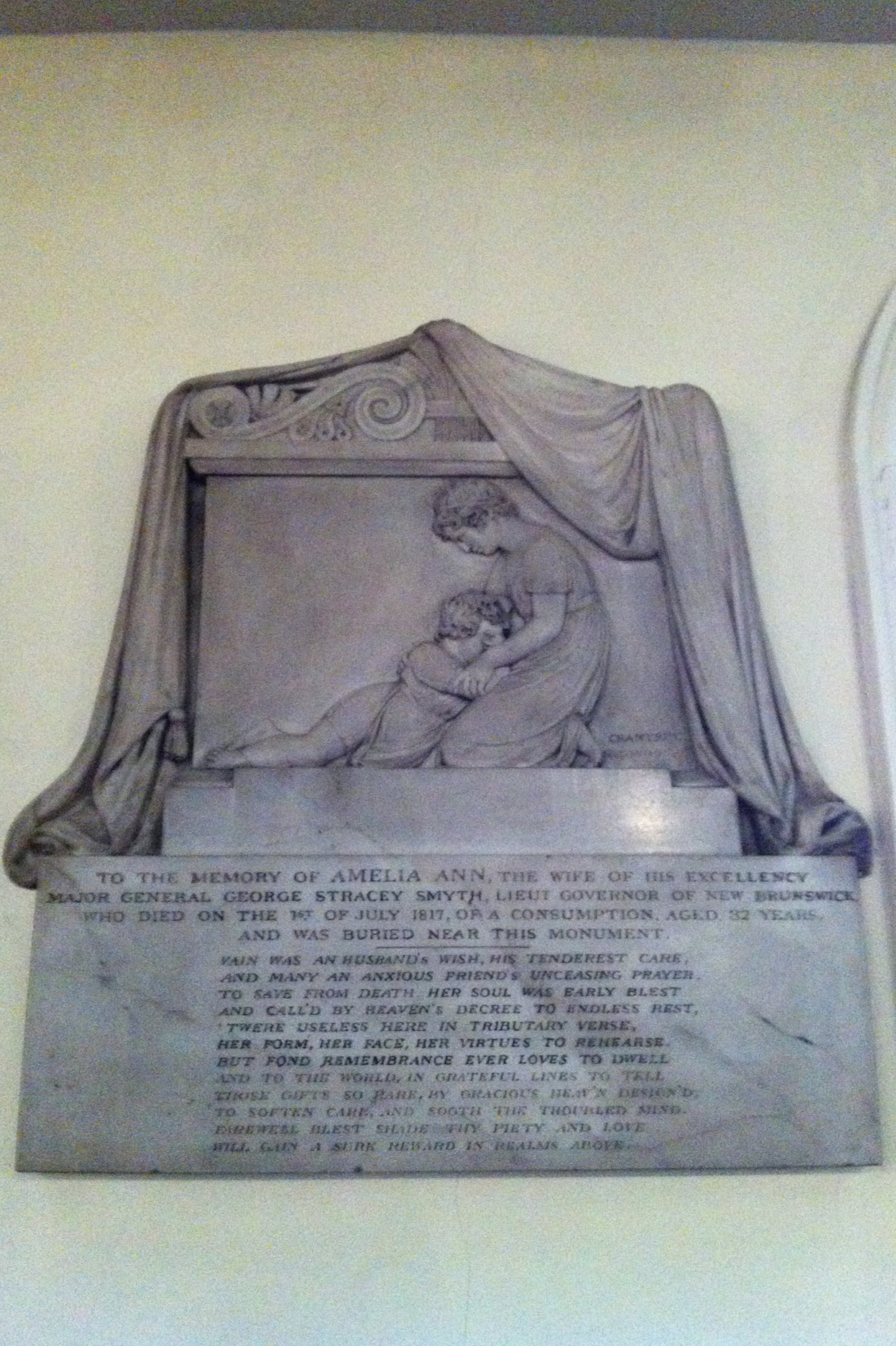
Monument to Amelia Ann Smyth, d. 1817 (wife of acting Lt. Gov. of Nova Scotia George Stracey Smyth), St Paul's Church, Nova Scotia

Chantrey was a prolific sculptor. According to an article published in 1842, he produced, besides his busts and reliefs, three equestrian statues, 18 standing ones, 18 seated ones and 14 recumbent figures. His most notable works include the statues of George III in The Guildhall, London; of George Washington in the Massachusetts State House; of George IV at Brighton (in bronze); of William Pitt the Younger in Hanover Square, London (in bronze); of James Watt in Westminster Abbey and in Greenock (also a bust, plus one of William Murdoch, at St Mary's Church, Handsworth); of William Roscoe and George Canning in Liverpool; of John Dalton in Manchester Town Hall; of Lord President Blair and Lord Melville in Edinburgh.

He made a bronze equestrian statue of Thomas Munro for Madras (now Chennai) and another of King George IV, originally commissioned, on the instructions of the King himself, to stand on top of the Marble Arch, in front of Buckingham Palace, but eventually placed in Trafalgar Square. The horses in these two works are identical. A third, of Arthur Wellesley, 1st Duke of Wellington for a site in front of the Royal Exchange in London, was completed after Chantrey's death.

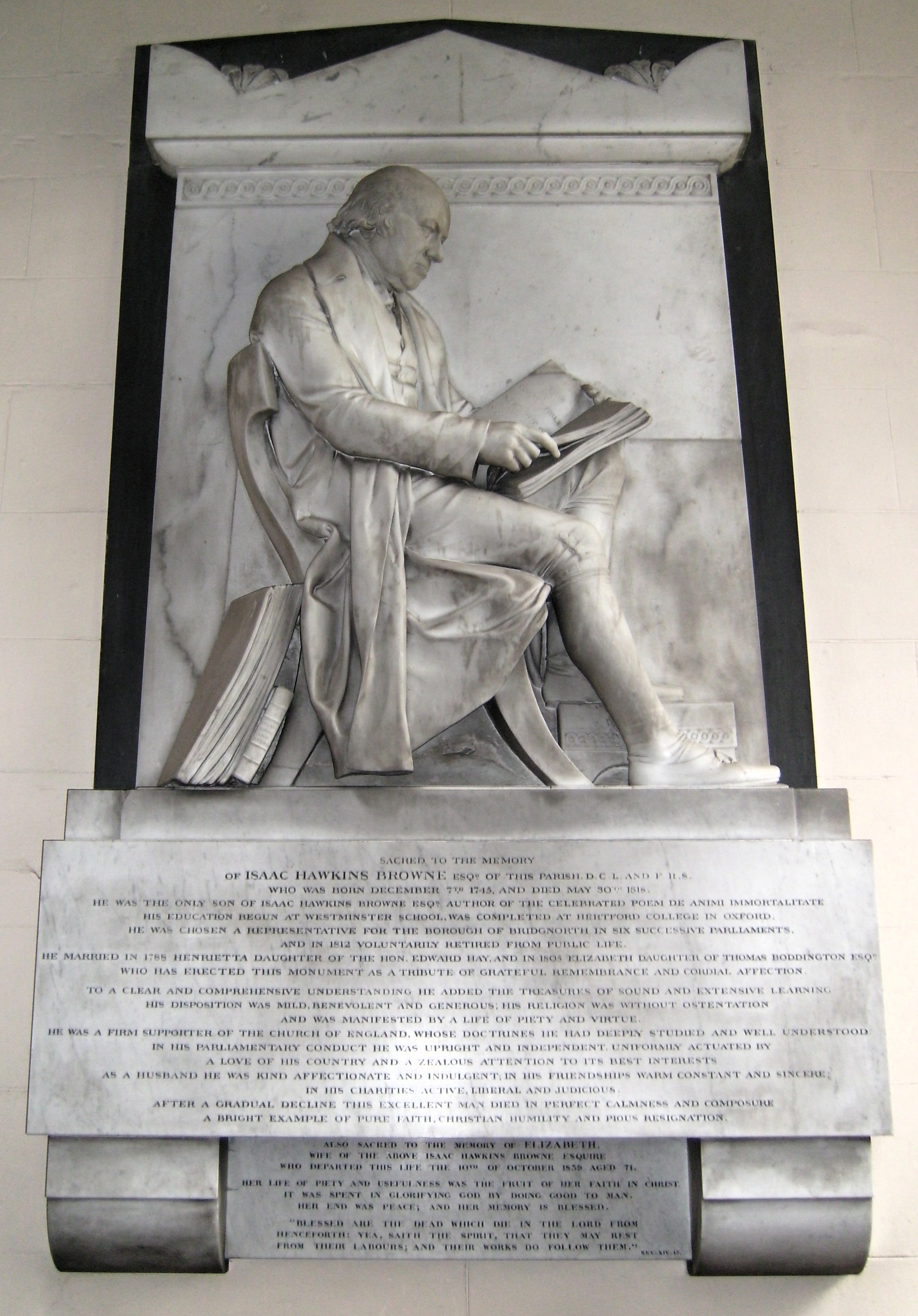
Chantrey's memorial for Isaac Hawkins Browne, Tory politician, coalowner and essayist, in the parish church of Badger, Shropshire, where he was lord of the manor

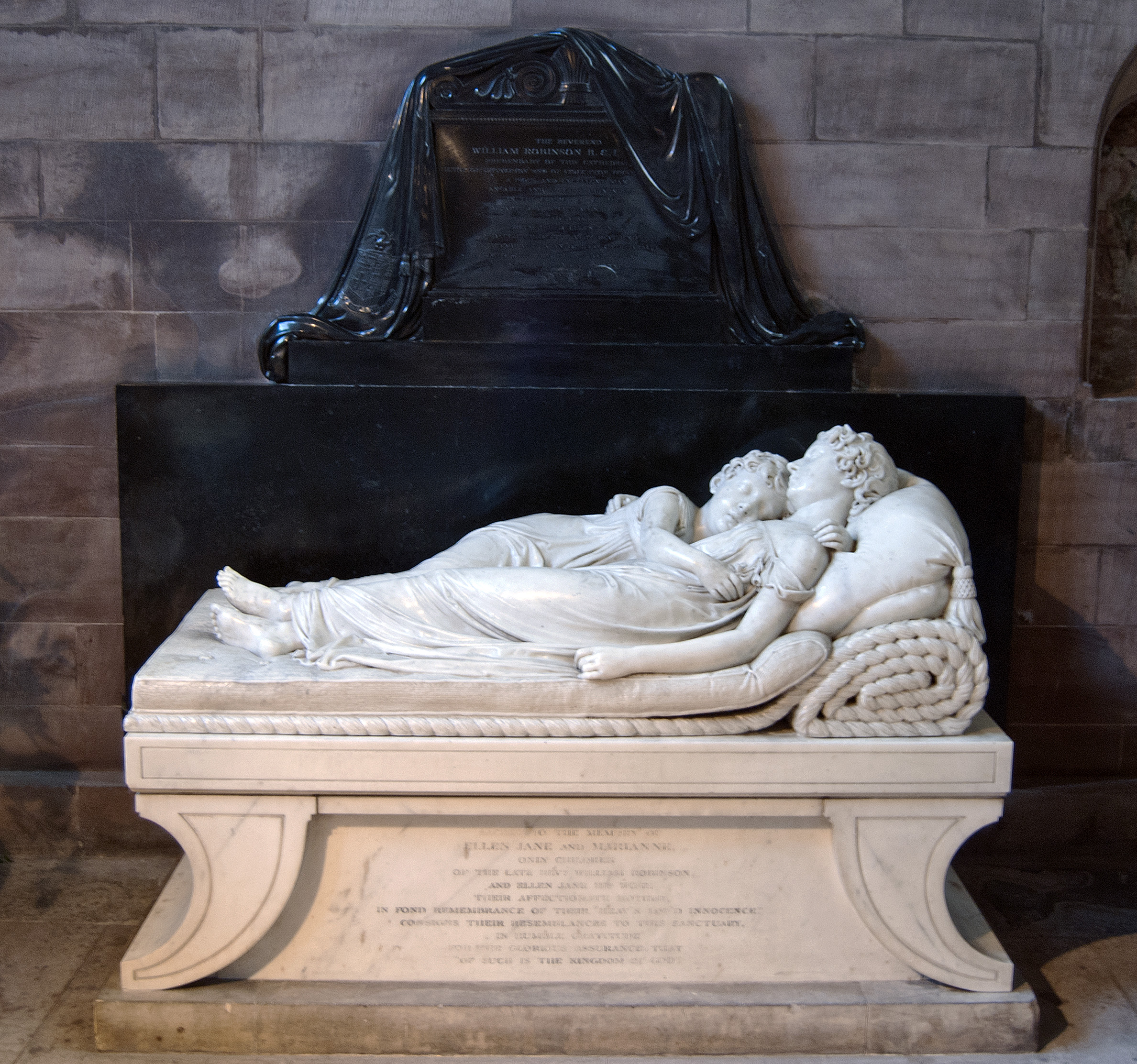
The Sleeping Children (1817) in Lichfield Cathedral, portrays two young sisters, Ellen-Jane and Marianne Robinson, who died in tragic circumstances in 1812.

He executed four monuments to military heroes for St Paul's Cathedral: they commemorate Major-General Daniel Hoghton, Major-General Barnard Foord Bowes, and Colonel Henry Cadogan, and (in a single monument) Major-Generals Arthur Gore and John Byne Skerrett. He was also responsible for the memorials to Sir James Brisbane in St James' Church, Sydney and to Reginald Heber in Calcutta, a replica of which was made for St Paul's Cathedral in London. Other good examples of his church monuments are those to John Maxwell, 2nd Earl of Farnham (1826) in Urney Parish Church, Cavan and Mary Anne Boulton (1834) in Great Tew In Snaith church there is a notable monument to John Dawnay, 5th Viscount Downe by Chantrey.

One of his most famous works was The Sleeping Children, a monument to two girls of the Robinson family, depicting them asleep in one another's arms, the younger holding a bunch of snowdrops. It attracted a great deal of attention when shown at the Royal Academy in 1817, before its installation in Lichfield Cathedral. The design of the monument was widely rumoured to be by Thomas Stothard; Chantrey's biographer, James Holland, however gave more credence to another account of its history, according to which Stothard had merely made a drawing from Chantrey's preliminary model. Another popular work, much reproduced, was a small statue, made for Woburn Abbey of the young Louisa, Lady Russell, depicted cradling a dove.

Derby Museum and Art Gallery has an unusual bust of William Strutt.

== Honours ==
Chantrey was elected an Associate of the Royal Academy in 1816 and a full Academician in 1818. In 1822 Henry Wolsey Bayfield named Chantry Island in Ontario after him. He received the degree of MA from Cambridge, and that of DCL from Oxford, and was knighted in 1835.

== Death ==
He died suddenly at his home in Eccleston Street, Pimlico, London, on 25 November 1841, having suffered from heart disease for some years. He was buried in a tomb constructed by his assistant James Heffernan in the churchyard of his native village, Norton in Derbyshire (now a suburb of Sheffield).

== Bequest ==
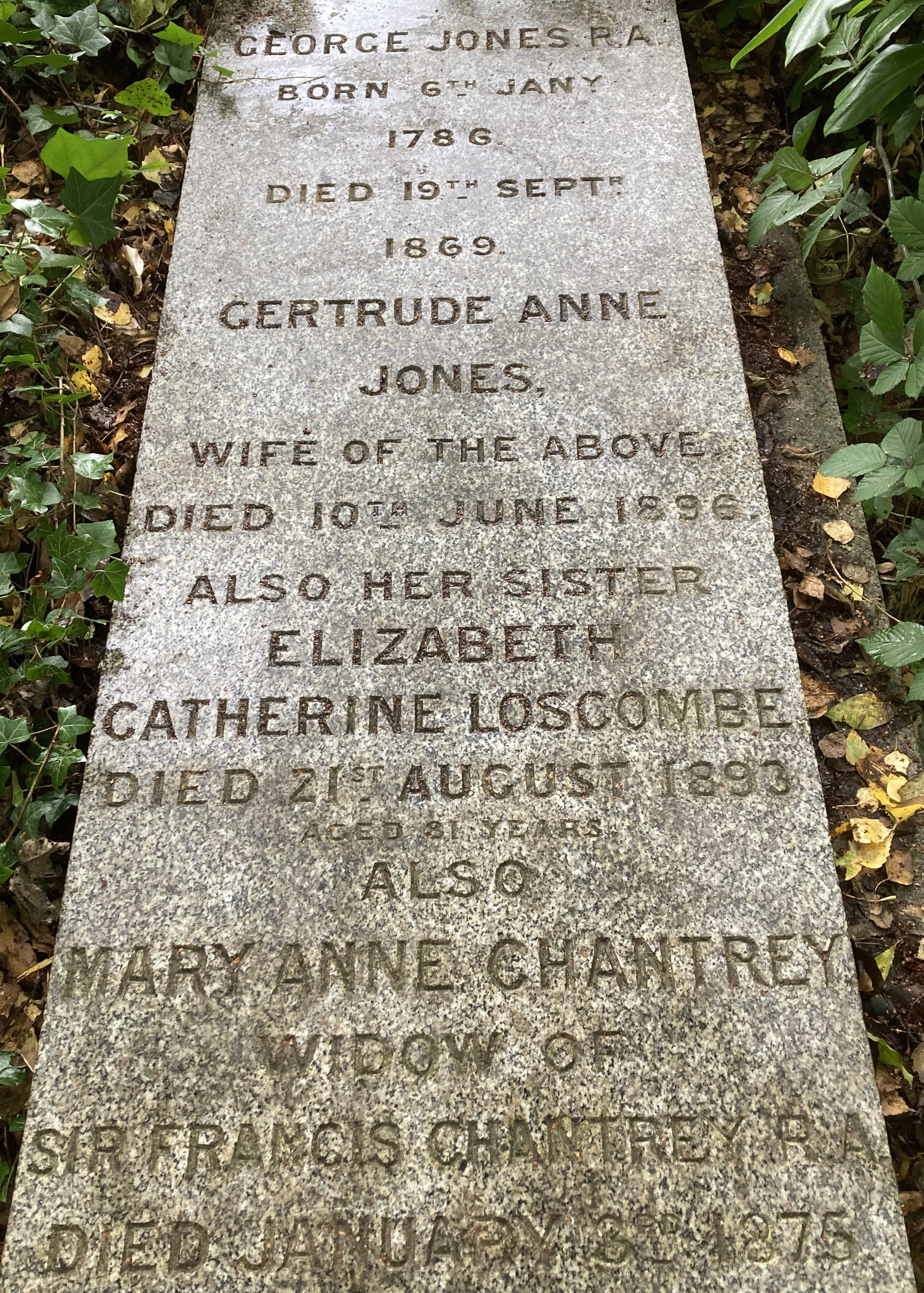
Grave of Lady Mary Ann Chantrey (née Wale) in Highgate Cemetery

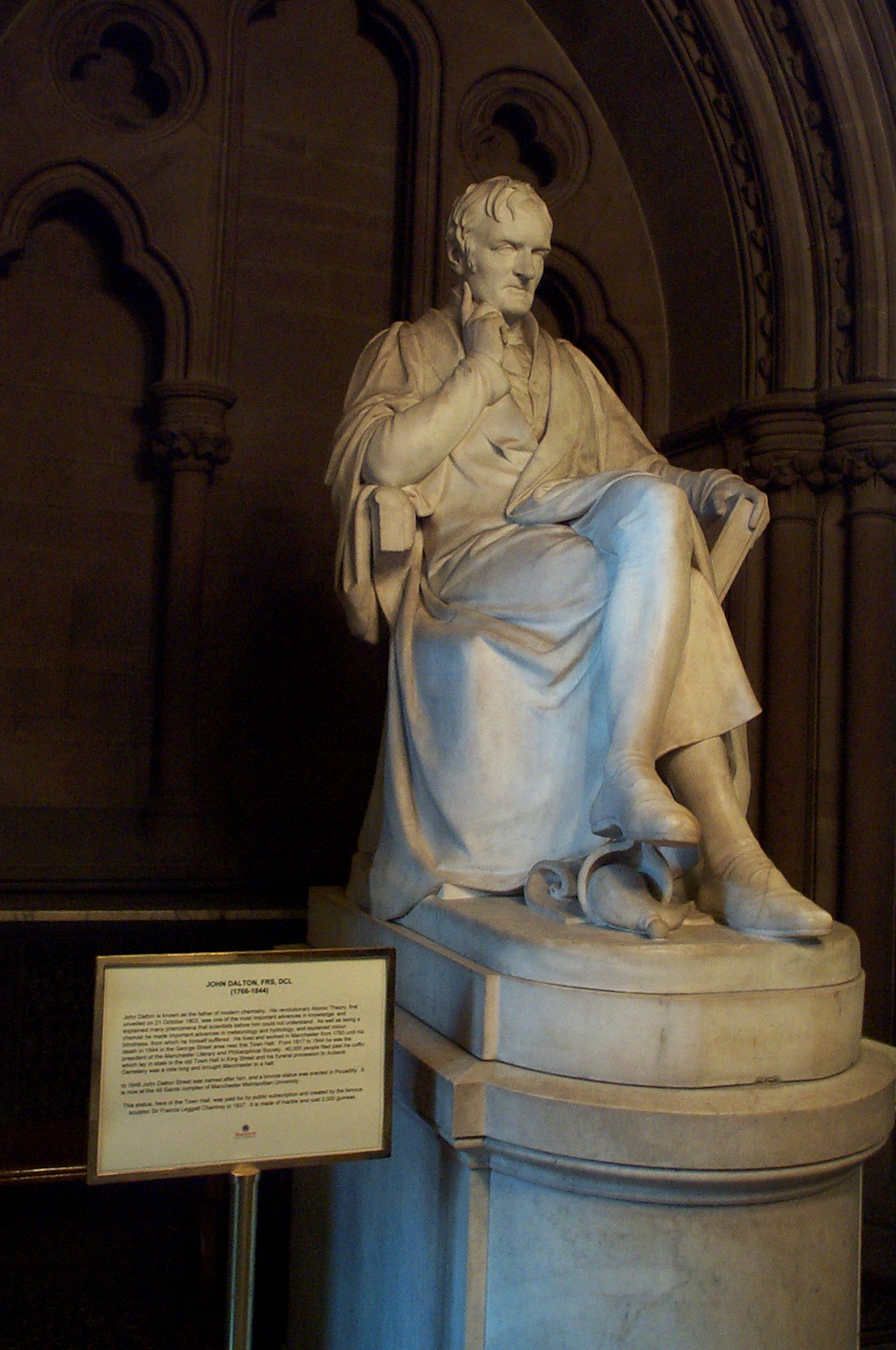
John Dalton statue at Manchester Town Hall

By his will, dated 31 December 1840, Chantrey (who had no children) left his whole residuary personal estate after the decease or on the second marriage of his widow (less certain specified annuities and bequests) in trust for the president and trustees of the Royal Academy (or in the event of its dissolution to such society as might take its place), the income to be devoted to the encouragement of British painting and sculpture, by "the purchase of works of fine art of the highest merit ... that can be obtained." The funds might be allowed to accumulate for not more than five years; works by British or foreign artists, dead or living, might be acquired, so long as such works were entirely executed within Great Britain, the artists having been in residence there during the execution and completion. The prices to be paid were to be "liberal," and no sympathy for an artist or his family was to influence the selection or the purchase of works, which were to be acquired solely on the ground of intrinsic merit. No commission or orders might be given: the works must be finished before purchase. Conditions were made as to the exhibition of the works, in the confident expectation that the government or the country would provide a suitable gallery for their display; and an annual sum of £300 and £50 was to be paid to the president and the secretary of the Royal Academy respectively, for the discharge of their duties in carrying out the provisions of the will.

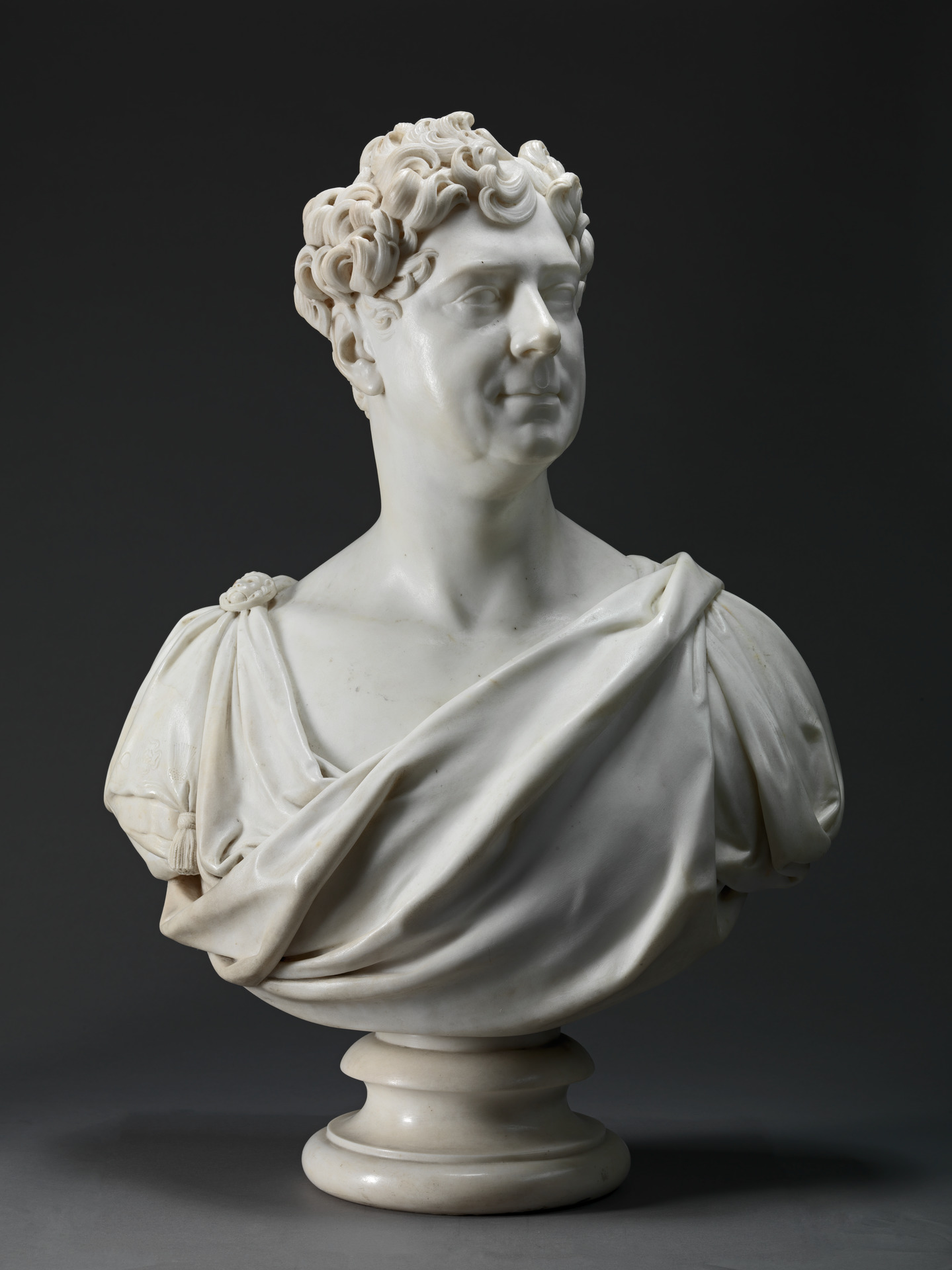
King George IV by Chantrey (1827)

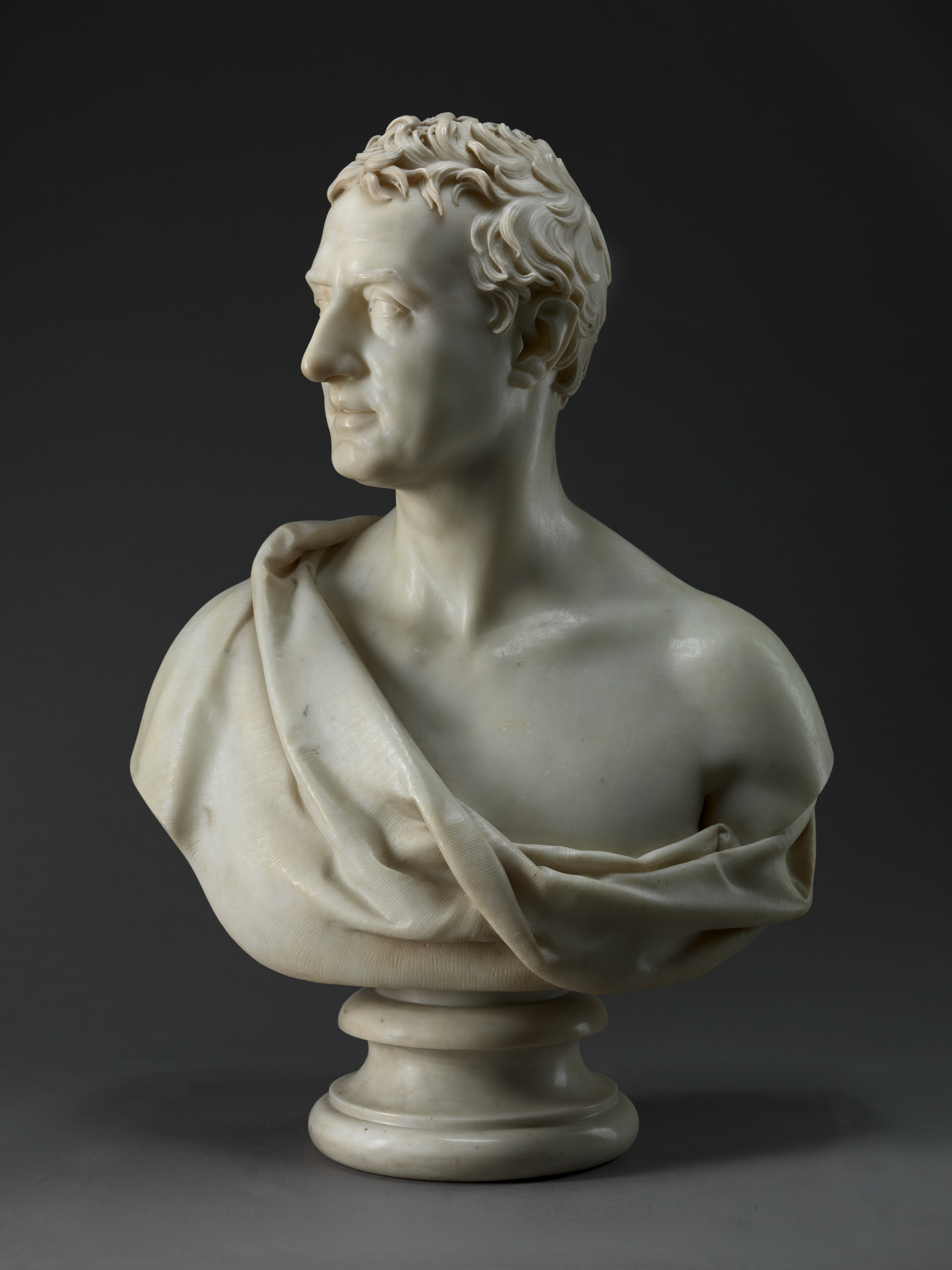
Lord Castlereagh (1821)

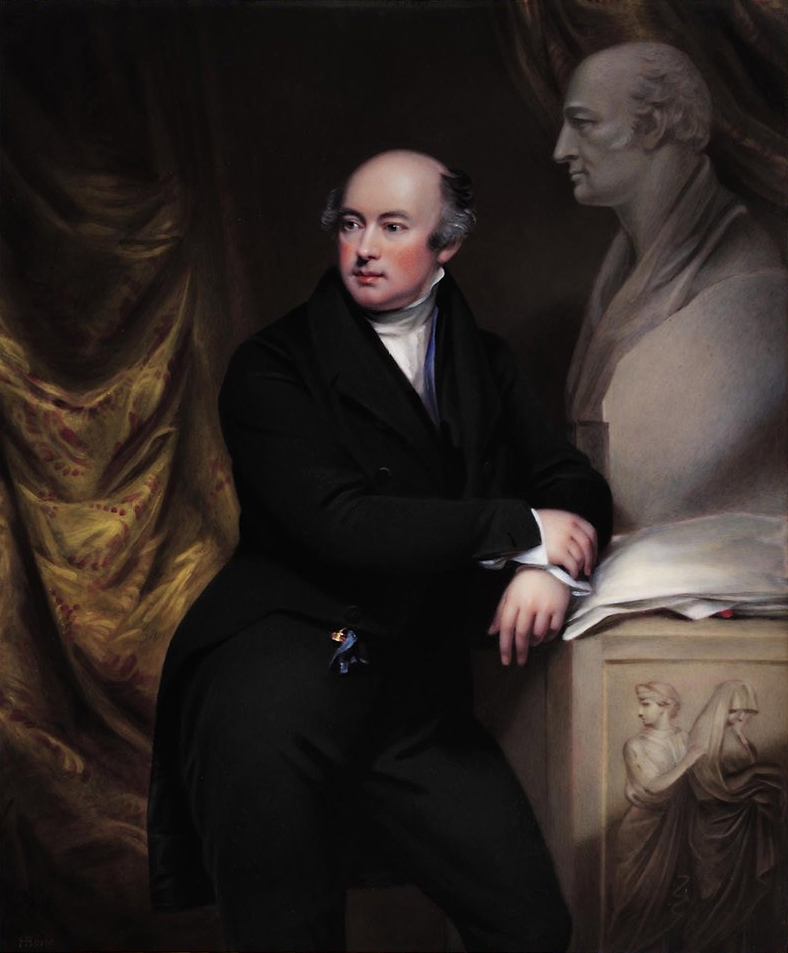
Portrait of Chantrey standing next to a bust of William Hyde Wollaston, 1831, by Henry Bone after John Jackson

Lady Chantrey died in 1875 and was buried with George Jones in Highgate Cemetery, and two years later the fund became available for the purchase of paintings and sculptures. The capital sum available amounted to £105,000 in 3% Consols (reduced to 2½% in 1903), which was producing an available annual income varying between £2,100 and £2,500 by around 1910. Initially the works acquired were shown at the Victoria and Albert Museum, but in 1898 the Royal Academy arranged with the treasury, on behalf of the government, for the transfer of the collection to the National Gallery of British Art, which had been erected by Sir Henry Tate at Millbank. It was agreed that the Tate Gallery should be its future home, but that the trustees and director of the National Gallery should have no power over what works were to be transferred there, or added to the collection at a later date.

By the end of 1905, 203 works had been bought—all but two from living artists—at a cost of nearly £68,000. Of these, 175 were oil paintings, 12 were watercolours, and 16 were sculptures. The bequest remained the main source of funding for expanding the collection of what is now Tate Britain until the 1920s, and it remains active today.

== Sources ==
- Citizens and Kings (Exhibition Catalogue). Royal Academy. 2007. ISBN 978-1-903973-23-3.
- Holland, John (n.d.). Memorials of Sir Francis Chantry, R. A., sculptor, in Hallamshire and Elsewhere. Sheffield: J. Pearce, Jun.
- Jones, George (1849). Sir Francis Chantrey, R. A. Recollections of his Life, Practice and Opinions. London: E. Moxon.
- Whinney, Margaret (1971). English Sculpture 1720–1830. Victoria and Albert Museum Monographs. London: Her Majesty's Stationery Office.

Attribution:
