= Mary Anne Jevons =

English poet

Mary Anne Jevons, née Roscoe (1795–1845) was an English poet.

== Life ==
Mary Anne Roscoe was born into a Unitarian family at Liverpool on 5 August 1795, the eldest daughter of William Roscoe and Jane Griffies (1757-1824). She was close to her father in her youth, and inherited a good deal of his poetic talent. She contributed to Poems for Youth, by a Family Circle, 1820–1, 2 parts (3rd edition 1841), and wrote Poems by one of the Authors of “Poems for Youth,” &c., 1821, 12mo, pp. 66.

She married Thomas Jevons, an ironmaster, on 23 November 1825. Among their eleven children, several of whom died young, was the economist William Stanley Jevons.

From 1831 to 1838 she edited The Sacred Offering, a Poetical Annual. As well as members of the Roscoe family, contributors included Anna Letitia Barbauld, Mary Anne Brown, Harriet Martineau, and Lydia Sigourney. Her own contributions were in 1845 collected under the title of Sonnets and other Poems, chiefly Devotional, 8vo, pp. x, 134.

In person, according to her DNB biographer, Jevons was "remarkably handsome, with very fascinating manners". She died at 37 Alfred Place, Bloomsbury on 13 November 1845.
