= The Sleeping Children =

Marble memorial to Ellen-Jane and Marianne Robinson, in Lichfield cathedral

Coordinates: 52.685665°N 1.829768°W

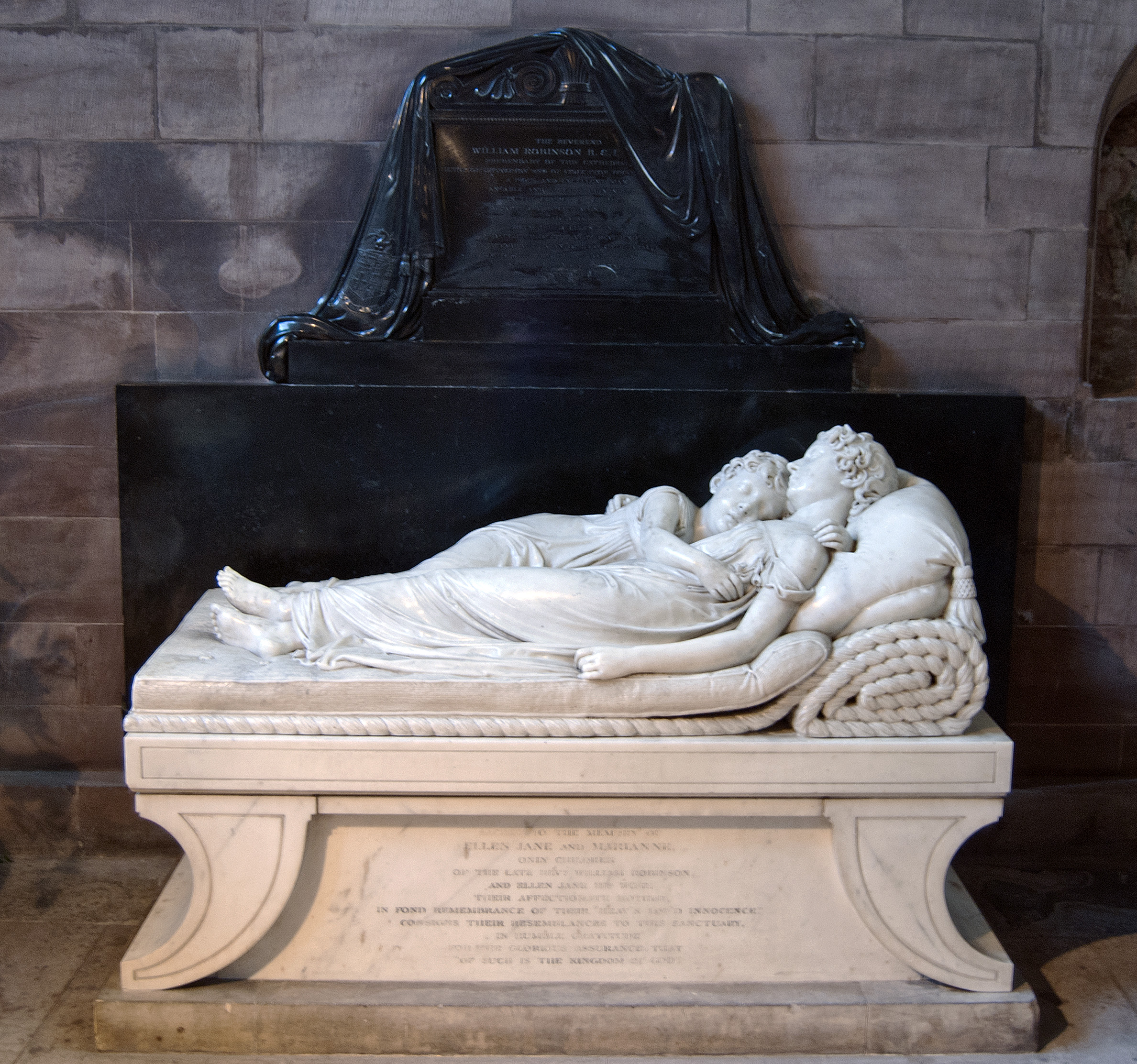
- Artist: Francis Chantrey
- Year: 1816
- Type: Marble sculpture
- Location: Lichfield Cathedral; Lichfield
- Owner: The Dean and Chapter

The Sleeping Children is a marble sculpture by Francis Chantrey. The statue depicts Ellen-Jane and Marianne Robinson asleep in each other's arms on a bed. The statue was commissioned by the mother of the two children, also named Ellen-Jane Robinson, whose daughters had died in 1813 and 1814.

The statue was placed in the south east corner of Lichfield Cathedral in 1817 where it remains. The work is considered to be one of Chantrey's finest works and one of the greatest works of English sculpture during the period.

== Subject ==
The sculpture depicts the two daughters of Ellen-Jane Robinson (née Woodhouse) lying asleep on a bed in each other's arms. The tragic story depicted by the sculpture begins in 1812, when Ellen-Jane's husband, the clergyman Reverend William Robinson, who had recently become a prebendary of Lichfield Cathedral, contracted tuberculosis and died. Reverend Robinson was in his thirties at the time of his death and left his wife with their two daughters.

In 1813, Ellen-Jane and her daughter, also named Ellen-Jane, were on a trip in Bath. During the trip, the daughter's nightdress caught fire while she was preparing for bed and she died of the burns she received. The following year, the younger daughter, Marianne, sickened and died while they were in London. Within three years, Ellen-Jane had lost her entire family and in her distress, she commissioned Francis Chantrey to secure a likeness of her lost children.

During a meeting with Chantrey, Ellen-Jane expressed to him a clear idea of what she wanted. She told Chantrey of how in the past she had watched as her daughters fell asleep in each other's arms and this is how she wanted them represented. She had also taken inspiration from Thomas Banks’ Boothby monument (1791) in St Oswald's Church, Ashbourne. The statue depicts Penelope Boothby, the daughter of Sir Brooke Boothby, 6th Baronet, who had died during childhood. Chantrey visited this monument and then returned to his home to make a model of his proposed sculpture.

== Construction and display ==
The statue was carved from white marble. The carving was entrusted to Chantrey's assistant, F. A. Lege, and it was his suggestion that the younger sister hold a bunch of snowdrops. The work was completed in time for the Royal Academy Art Exhibition of 1816, where it was a sensation. The statue was moved to the south east corner of Lichfield Cathedral in 1817 and remains there to this day. Above the statue is a black marble plaque dedicated to William Robinson (the father of the two children).

== Legacy ==
=== Literature ===
In 1826 the poet William Lisle Bowles wrote a poem about the sculpture:

Look at those sleeping children; softly tread,
Lest thou do mar their dream, and come not nigh
Till their fond mother, with a kiss, shall cry,
'Tis morn, awake! awake! Ah! they are dead!
Yet folded in each other's arms they lie,
So still—oh, look! so still and smilingly,
So breathing and so beautiful, they seem,
As if to die in youth were but to dream
Of spring and flowers! Of flowers? Yet nearer stand
There is a lily in one little hand,
Broken, but not faded yet,
As if its cup with tears were wet.
So sleeps that child, not faded, though in death,
And seeming still to hear her sister's breath,
As when she first did lay her head to rest
Gently on that sister's breast,
And kissed her ere she fell asleep!
The archangel's trump alone shall wake that slumber deep.
Take up those flowers that fell
From the dead hand, and sigh a long farewell!
Your spirits rest in bliss!
Yet ere with parting prayers we say,
Farewell for ever to the insensate clay,
Poor maid, those pale lips we will kiss!
Ah! 'tis cold marble! Artist, who hast wrought
This work of nature, feeling, and of thought;
Thine, Chantrey, be the fame
That joins to immortality thy name.
For these sweet children that so sculptured rest
A sister's head upon a sister's breast
Age after age shall pass away,
Nor shall their beauty fade, their forms decay.
For here is no corruption; the cold worm
Can never prey upon that beauteous form:
This smile of death that fades not, shall engage
The deep affections of each distant age!
Mothers, till ruin the round world hath rent,
Shall gaze with tears upon the monument!
And fathers sigh, with half-suspended breath:
How sweetly sleep the innocent in death!

Felicia Hemans' poem on this subject was published in the Forget-Me-Not annual for 1829: "The Sculptured Children".

=== Television ===
In 2011 the sculpture was featured on the BBC programme Romancing the Stone: The Golden Ages of British Sculpture.
