= The Butterfly's Ball, and the Grasshopper's Feast =

1802 poem by William Roscoe

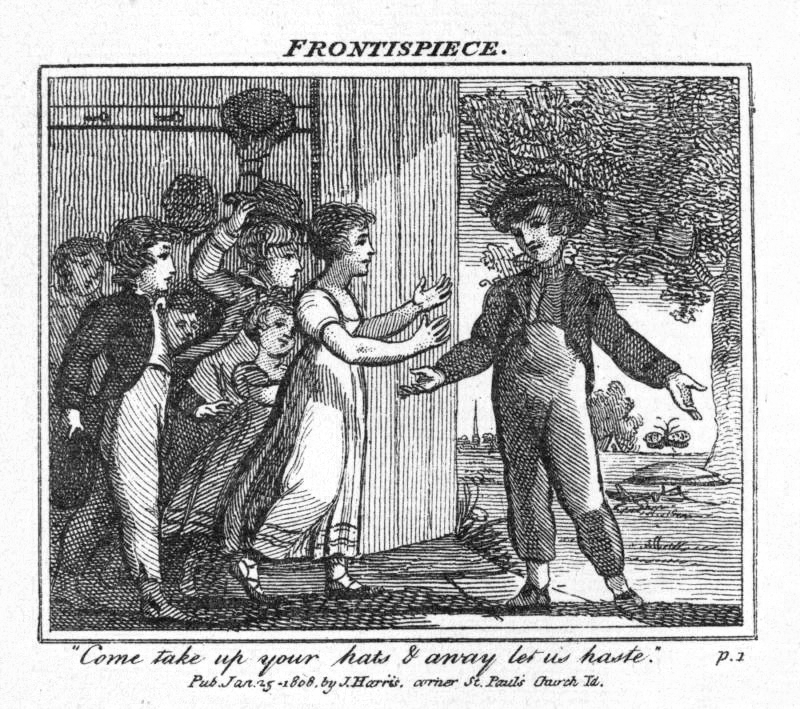
Frontispiece of the 1808, London, publication of The Butterfly's Ball, and the Grasshopper's Feast

The Butterfly's Ball, and the Grasshopper's Feast is a poem by William Roscoe, written in 1802, and telling the story of a party for insects and other small animals.

== Background ==
Two anonymous sequels were The Peacock 'At Home' and The Lion's Masquerade and the Elephant's Champetre, both initially credited to "A Lady", and describing similar parties for birds and large mammals. The Peacock 'At Home' was very popular and the 1809 edition revealed the author to be Catherine Ann Dorset.

The Butterfly Ball and the Grasshopper's Feast is also the title of a 1973 picture book by Alan Aldridge and William Plomer, loosely based on the poem. This greatly expanded and altered the original work, focusing more on the animals' preparations for the Ball. Aldridge went on to create two more books based on the sequels; The Peacock Party and The Lion's Cavalcade.

An animated short based on Aldridge's illustrations, but once more focusing on the Ball itself, was made in 1974, with Roger Glover writing the accompanying song 'Love Is All", based on the song "Love's All You Need" mentioned in the book. This was supposed to lead to a full length animated film, which did not get made. However, Glover had written a full soundtrack, which was performed and released as a rock opera, The Butterfly Ball and the Grasshopper's Feast.
