= Margaret M'Avoy =

English impostor

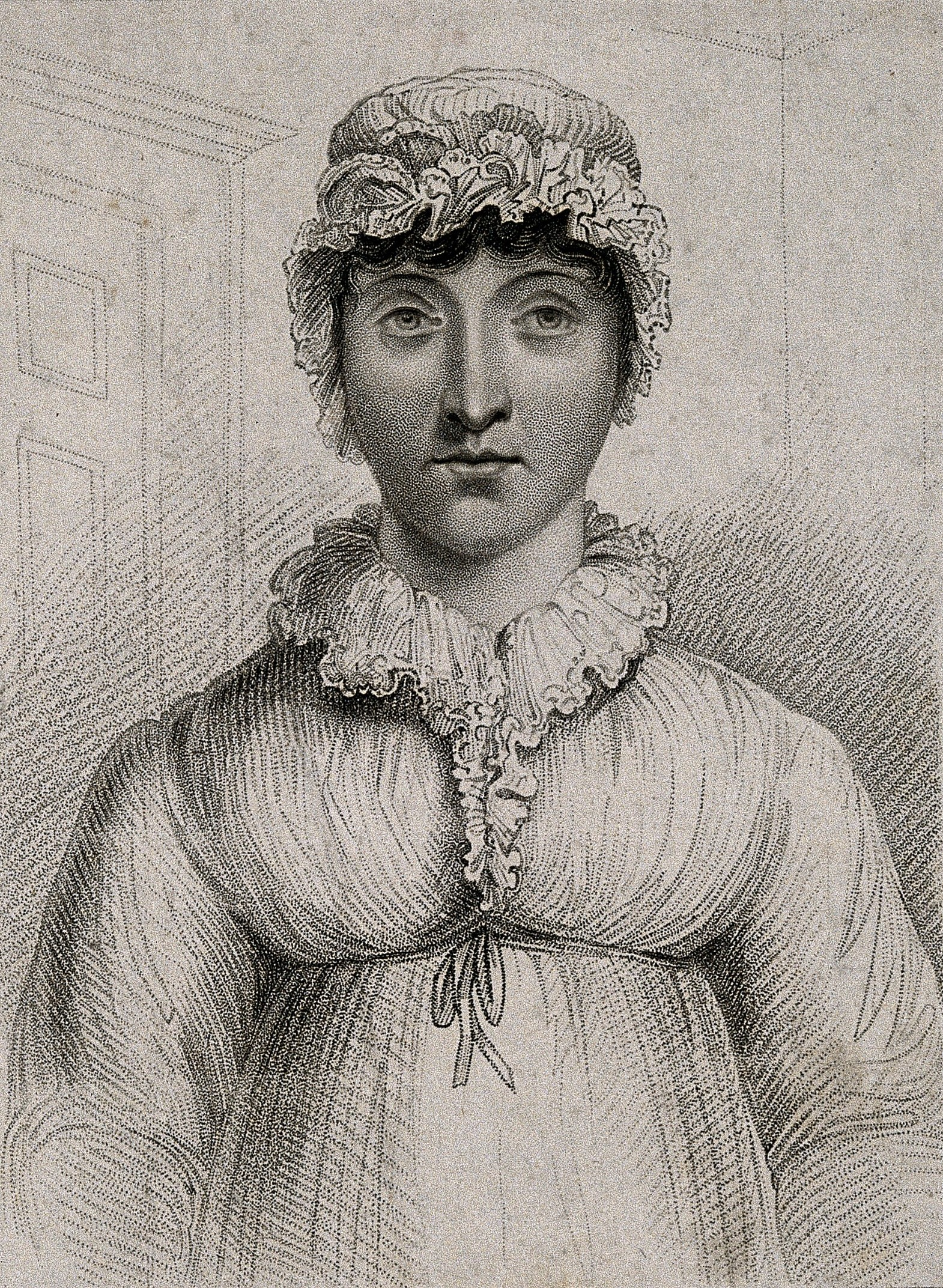
- "Margeret M'Avoy, blind but with remarkable perception"
- Born: 28 June 1800; Liverpool
- Died: 18 August 1820 (aged 20); Liverpool

Margaret M'Avoy (28 June 1800 – 18 August 1820) was a British impostor.

== Life ==
M'Avoy was born in Liverpool in 1800. She allegedly went blind and she became well known as she was said to be able to sense colours "through the medium of her fingers" despite her lack of sight.

Her claims were investigated by the Liverpool historian William Roscoe at the request of Sir Joseph Banks. Roscoe concluded that her amazing abilities were due to the fact that she was not blind.

M'Avoy died in Liverpool in 1820.
