= Anglo-Ethiopian Society =

Sir George Paish

The Anglo-Ethiopian Society's stated goal is "to foster knowledge of Ethiopian culture, history and way of life and to encourage friendship between the British and Ethiopian peoples." The society was founded in November 1948 by Professor Norman Bentwich. The famed English economist Sir George Paish served for a time as co-president of the society. Herbert Stanley Jevons also served as treasurer.
