= William Stanley Roscoe =

English poet

William Stanley Roscoe (1782 – 31 October 1843) was an English poet, banker and abolitionist.

== Life ==
William Stanley Roscoe, son of William Roscoe by his wife Jane, daughter of Jane, second daughter of William Griffies, a Liverpool tradesman, was born at Liverpool in 1782. He was educated at Peterhouse, Cambridge, and became a partner in his father's bank. In his latter years he was serjeant-at-mace to the court of passage at Liverpool. He died at Liverpool on 31 October 1843. (Note: Gentleman's Magazine 1844, i. 96.) He was the father of William Caldwell Roscoe. and Francis James Roscoe.

== Works ==
Roscoe was well acquainted with Italian literature, and in 1834 published a volume of Poems (London, 8vo), which was eulogised in Blackwood's Magazine. (Note: Blackwood's Magazine February 1835, pp. 153–60.) According to Warwick William Wroth, writing in the Dictionary of National Biography, the verse is for the most part commonplace in subject and treatment. However, some later critics have found merit in several anti-slavery poems published in the volume, including the Pindaric "Ode to May, Written in 1807, on the Abolition of the African Slave Trade"; "On the Last Regiment of Polish Patriots Being Ordered by the French Government to Serve in the Island of St. Domingo", which concerns the quashing of the slave-led Haitian Revolution; and "The Ethiop", which imagines the overthrow of Caribbean slavery through a war of liberation led by an African-born hero loosely based on Toussaint L'Ouverture and includes strong Gothic themes.

One of Roscoe's poems, "To Spring: On the Banks of the Cam", was anthologised by Sir Arthur Quiller-Couch in his 1912 Oxford Book of Victorian Verse.

== Bibliography ==
- Kitson, Peter J.; Lee, Debbie; Mellor, Anne K.; Walvin, James (1999). Slavery, Abolition and Emancipation. Vol. 4. Online: Taylor & Francis. n.p.
- Wroth, Warwick William (1897). "Roscoe, William (1753-1831)" . In Lee, Sidney (ed.). Dictionary of National Biography. Vol. 49. London: Smith, Elder & Co. p. 225.
