= Angelo Fabroni =

Italian biographer and historian

- Bust of Angelo Fabroni by Giovanni Antonio Santarelli
- Born: 25 September 1732; Marradi, Grand Duchy of Tuscany
- Died: 22 September 1803 (aged 70); Pisa, Kingdom of Etruria
- Occupations: Catholic priest; Biographer; Historian
- Known for: Vitae Italorum doctrina excellentium (1778-1799; 1804-1805)

Angelo Fabroni (25 September 1732 – 22 September 1803) was an Italian biographer and historian.

== Biography ==
Angelo Fabroni was born in Marradi, near Florence, to Alessandro and Giacinta Fabroni, who came from a wealthy banking family. After completing his early education in his hometown, he enrolled at the Collegio Bandinelli in Rome. Following the death of his father in 1750, the Florentine scholar Pier Francesco Foggini became his mentor.

Fabroni was ordained as a priest in 1755. Upon completing his studies, he remained in Rome, where he was introduced to the renowned Jansenist historian Giovanni Gaetano Bottari, librarian of the Biblioteca Corsiniana. He translated some of Pasquier Quesnel's devotional works and became a canon at Santa Maria in Trastevere. With Bottari's help, he published his first major biographical work: De vita et rebus gestis Clementis XII. Pont. Max. Commentarius, an elegant Latin biography of Pope Clement XII. The work was financed by the Pope's nephew, Cardinal Neri Corsini, who covered the printing costs in honour of his uncle's legacy and pontificate. In 1755, Cardinal Giuseppe Agostino Orsi tasked Fabroni with delivering a Latin oration in the papal chapel before Pope Benedict XIV. The pope was so impressed that he granted Fabroni an annuity, enabling him to devote himself entirely to study. In 1766, Fabroni delivered the funeral oration for James Francis Edward Stuart, the Jacobite pretender to the throne of Great Britain. The following year, Leopold, Grand Duke of Tuscany, appointed him as the Prior of the Basilica of San Lorenzo in Florence.

During this period, Fabroni began working on the Vitae Italorum doctrina excellentium, a comprehensive biographical dictionary of Italian scholars, for which he is best known. The first volume, published in Pisa in 1766, was well received by the public, but was harshly criticised by the Jesuits, who opposed Fabroni because of his Jansenist leanings. In 1771, he started publishing the literary journal Giornale de' letterati, which he continued to edit until 1796. In around 1772, Fabroni travelled to Paris, where he became acquainted with Condorcet, Diderot, d'Alembert, Rousseau, and most of the Encyclopédistes. He was unimpressed by the French philosophes, particularly their utter contempt for religion. He then moved to London, where he spent four months and befriended Joseph Priestley and Benjamin Franklin. Franklin invited Fabroni to travel back with him to North America, but Fabroni ultimately refused the offer. He returned to Tuscany in 1773 and died in retirement among the Carthusians in Pisa.

== Main works ==
- Vitae Italorum doctrina excellentium qui in saeculis XVII. et XVIII. floruerunt (20 vols., Pisa, 1778-1799, 1804-1805);
- Laurentii Medicei Magnifici Vita (2 vols., Pisa, 1784), which served as a basis for William Roscoe's Life of Lorenzo de' Medici;
- Magni Cosmi Medicei Vita (Pisa, 1789);
- Historia Academiae Pisanae (2 vols., Pisa, 1792);
- Leonis X pontificis maximi Vita (Pisa, 1797);
- Elogi di Dante Alighieri, di Angelo Poliziano, di Lodovico Ariosto, e di Torquato Tasso (Parma, 1800).
