= Sunspots (TV program) =

- Genre: Travel
- Created by: Frank Daley
- Written by: Frank Daley
- Presented by: Nelson Davis
- Country of origin: Canada
- Original language: English
- No. of seasons: 2

Production
- Producer: Paul Gaffney
- Production location: Ottawa
- Running time: 30 minutes

Original release
- Network: CBC Television
- Release: 13 July 1974 – 25 May 1975

Sunspots is a Canadian travel television program that aired on CBC Television in 1974 and 1975.

== Premise ==
This program featured information on various travel destinations such as Austria, Trinidad and Tobago, and domestic locations such as Île d'Orléans. Footage was recorded on Super 8 mm film.

== Scheduling ==
This half-hour program was broadcast over two years, first on Saturdays at 12:30 p.m. (Eastern time) from 13 July to 28 September 1974, then on Sundays at 10:30 a.m. from 16 March to 25 May 1975.
