= The Statist =

- Editor: Paul Bareau (1961-1967)
- Categories: Business, Finance, Economics
- Frequency: Weekly (initially), Relaunched in 1961
- Format: Magazine
- Circulation: 20,000-30,000 (final circulation)
- Publisher: IPC Magazines (from 1961)
- Founded: 1878
- First issue: 1878
- Final issue Number: 1967; Fewer than 200 issues (1961-1967 relaunch)
- Country: United Kingdom
- Language: English

The Statist was a British magazine. It was established in 1878. From 1878 to 1894, its subtitle was "a weekly journal for economics and men of business"; from 1894 the subtitle was "an independent journal of finance and trade". From 1894 to 1900 the assistant editor was George Paish.

The magazine was relaunched in 1961 by IPC Magazines, with Paul Bareau as editor. It was intended as a rival to The Economist, and had a similar design. By 1967, Bareau was editor-in-chief.

The magazine was closed in 1967 with sales of 20,000-30,000 copies, with fewer than 200 issues.
