= Sunspottery =

Sunspots purportedly causing terrestrial events

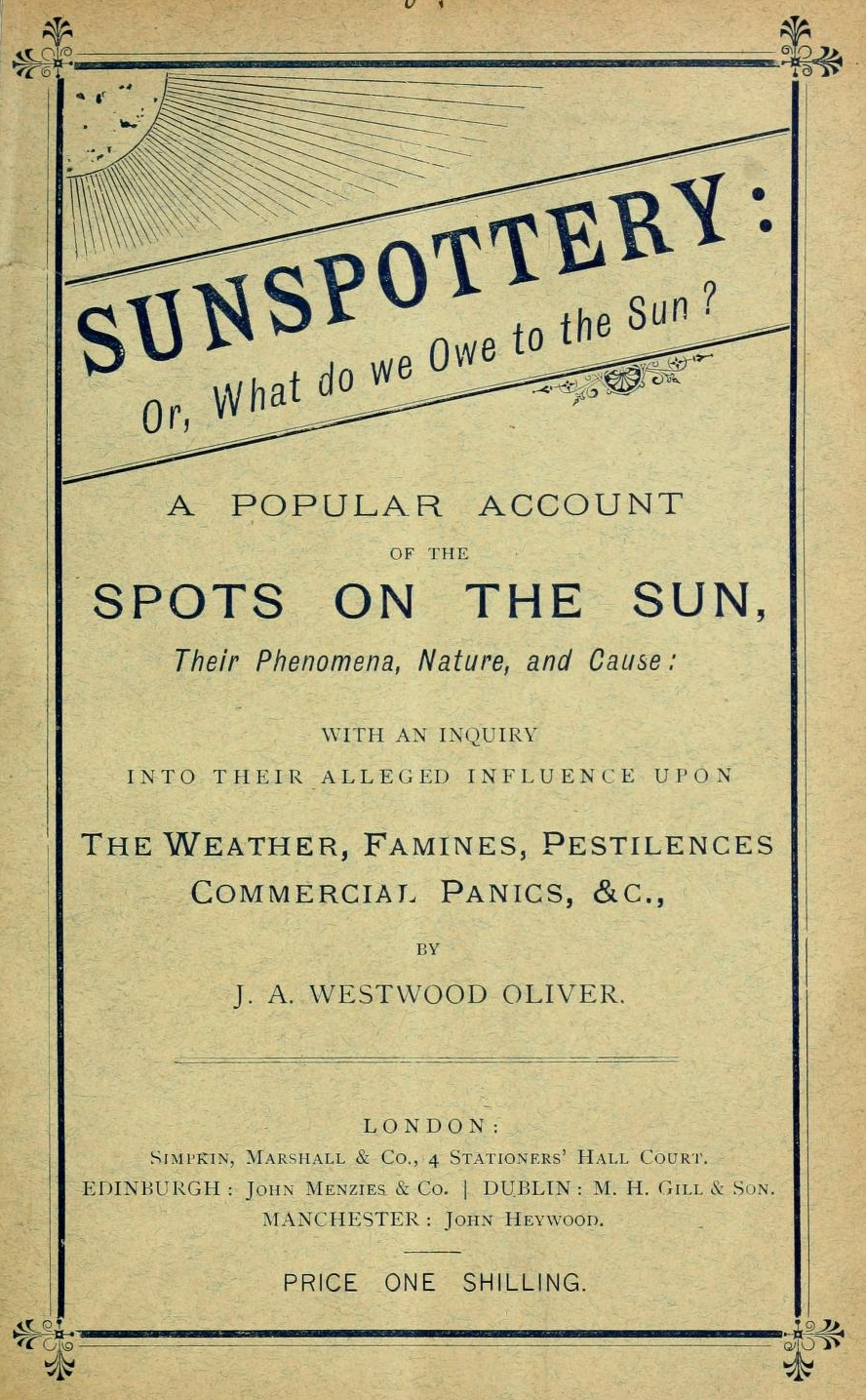
Cover of the 1883 book by J.A. Westwood Oliver

Sunspottery was a pejorative term assigned to a late 19th century trend to ascribe sunspots and their cycles as causes for various cyclic phenomena, including disease outbreaks and economic crises.

William Stanley Jevons read a paper On the influence of the sun-spot period upon the price of corn at a meeting of the British Association for the Advancement of Science in 1875. This was followed by a great deal of media interest and a period when it became fanciful to blame the sun for all kinds of events, with the term being used pejoratively in the newspapers. Jevons later wrote to the Times in April 1879 stating that despite the abuse of his idea "the activity of commerce in England ultimately depends upon the solar activity". A pamphlet dealing with the facts of solar cycles, use, and misuse published in 1883 was reviewed by The Globe, which noted that "Sun-spottery is not what it is represented to be, but is, for the most part, humbug."

Sunspot cycles affecting weather and various other phenomena have however continued to be of interest and are still a serious subject of study.

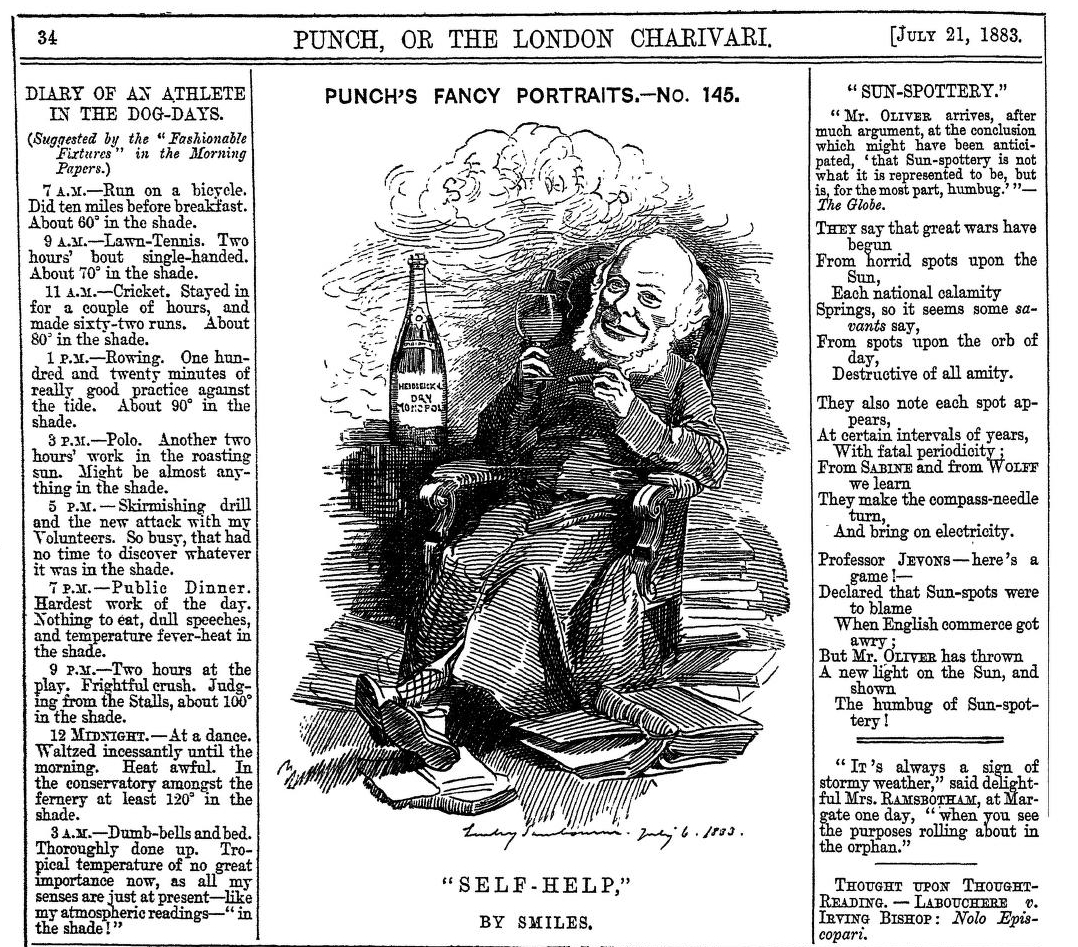
Commentary in Punch 1883

== See also ==
- Brückner-Egeson-Lockyer cycle
- Sunspots (economics)
