= Elaine of Astolat =

Figure in Arthurian legend

- Matter of Britain character
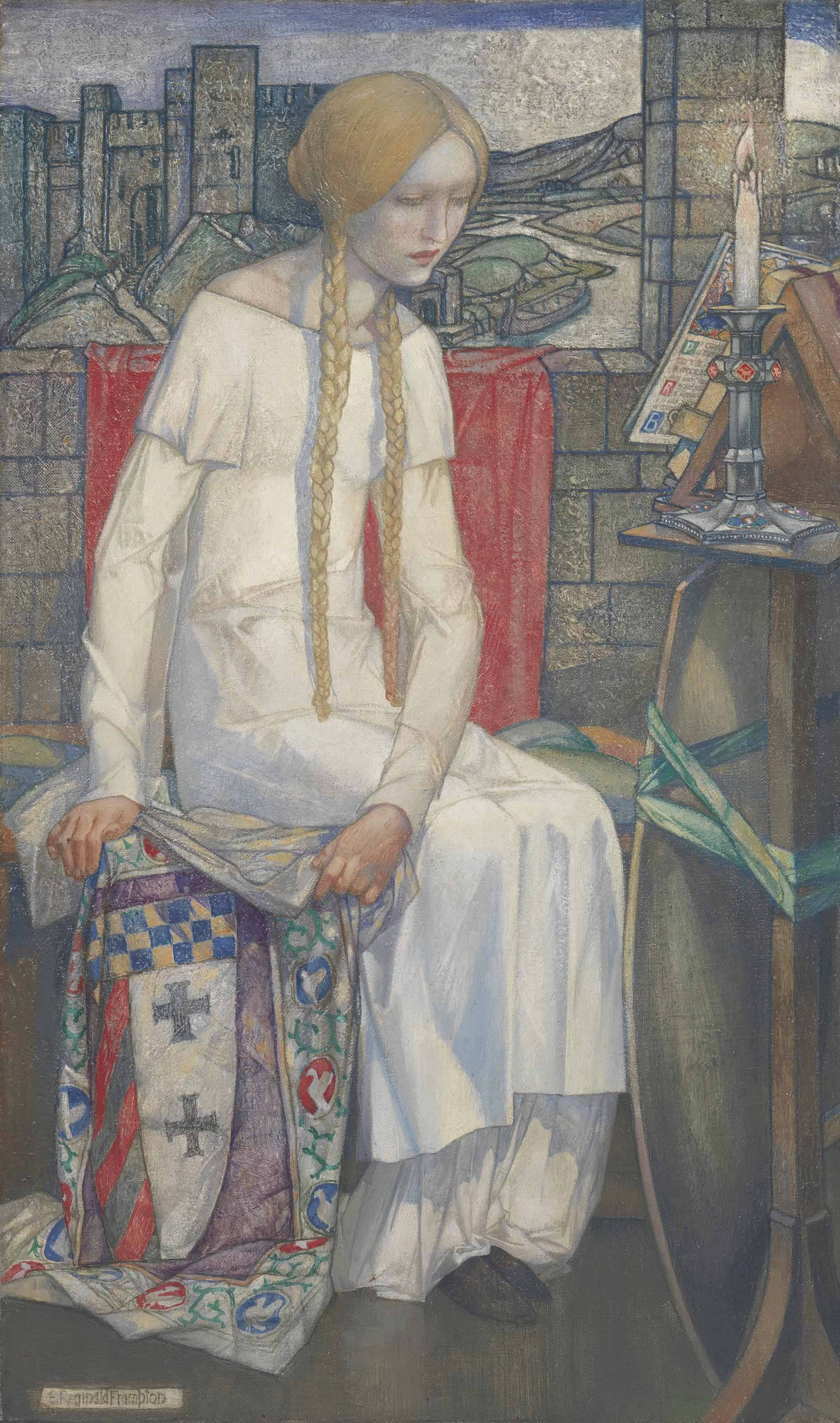
- Elaine, the Lady of Shallott by Edward Reginald Frampton (1920)
- First appearance: Vulgate Cycle

In-universe information
- Home: Astolat

Elaine of Astolat (/ˈæstəˌlæt, -ɑːt/), also known as Elayne of Ascolat and other variants of the name, is a figure in Arthurian legend. She is a lady from the castle of Astolat who dies of her unrequited love for Sir Lancelot. Well-known versions of her story appear in Sir Thomas Malory's 1485 book Le Morte d'Arthur, Alfred, Lord Tennyson's mid-19th-century Idylls of the King, and Tennyson's poem "The Lady of Shalott". She should not be confused with Elaine of Corbenic, the mother of Sir Galahad.

== Legend ==
The possibly original version of the story appeared in the early 13th-century French prose romance Mort Artu, in which the Lady of Escalot (Demoiselle d'Escalot) dies of unrequited love for Lancelot and drifts down a river to Camelot in a boat. In the 14th-century English poem Stanzaic Morte Arthur, she is known as the Maid of Ascolot. Thomas Malory's 15th-century compilation of Arthurian tales, Le Morte d'Arthur, includes the story.

Another version is told in the 13th-century Italian short story La Damigella di Scalot (No. LXXXII in the collection Il Novellino: Le ciento novelle antike). Two of Tennyson's famous and influential poems, both titled "The Lady of Shalott" (1832 and 1842), were later inspired by the Italian variant.

=== Le Morte d'Arthur ===
In Malory's telling, Elaine's episode begins when her father Bernard, the lord of Astolat (William Caxton's misread of Malory's original Ascolat), organises a tournament attended by King Arthur and his knights. While Sir Lancelot was not originally planning to attend, he is persuaded otherwise and visits Bernard and his two sons before the tournament. While Lancelot is in her family's household, Elaine becomes enamoured of him and begs him to wear her token at the coming tournament. Explaining that Queen Guinevere would be at the tournament, he consents to wear the token but says that he will have to fight in disguise so as not to be recognized. He asks Bernard if he can leave his recognizable shield with him and borrow another. Bernard agrees and lends him the plain-white shield of Sir Torre, Elaine's brother.

Lancelot goes on to win the jousting tournament, still in disguise, fighting against King Arthur's party and beating forty of them in the tournament. He does, however, receive an injury to his side from Sir Bors' lance, and is carried off the field by Elaine's other brother, Sir Lavaine, to the hermit Sir Baudwin's cave (Baudwin being a former knight of the Round Table himself). Elaine then urges her father to let her bring the wounded Lancelot to her chambers, where she nurses him. When Lancelot is well, he makes ready to leave, and offers to pay Elaine for her services; insulted, Elaine brings him his shield, which she had been guarding, and a wary Lancelot leaves the castle, never to return but now aware of her feelings for him.

Ten days later, Elaine dies of heartbreak. In accordance with her instructions, her body is placed in a small boat, clutching a lily in one hand, and her final letter in the other. She then floats down the river to Camelot, where she is discovered by King Arthur's court, who call her 'a little lily maiden'. Lancelot is summoned and hears the contents of the letter, which explains what happened. Ashamed, he pays for her rich burial.

== Modern culture ==
=== Paintings and illustrations ===
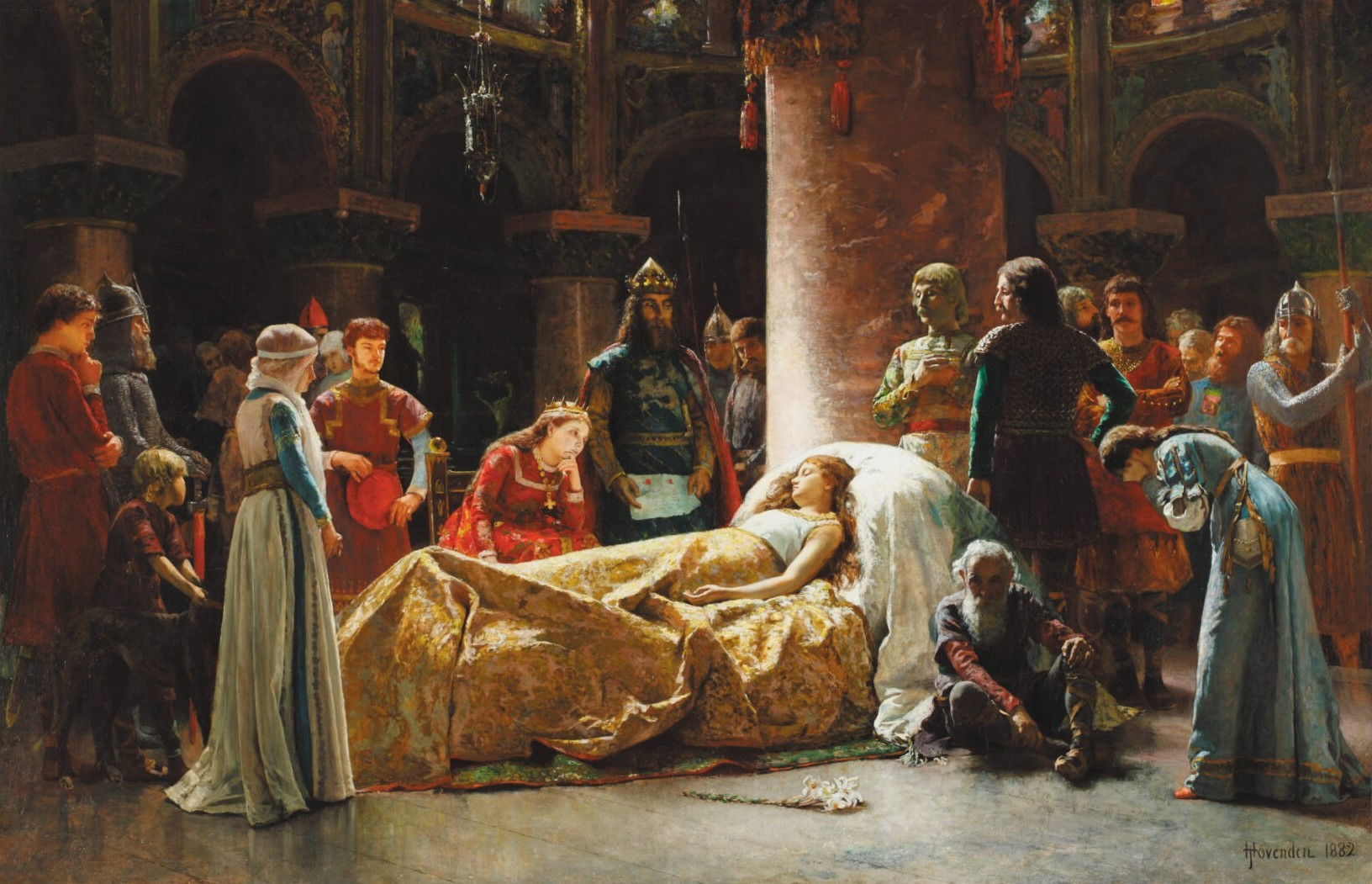
The Death of Elaine (1882) by Thomas Hovenden, Westmoreland Museum of American Art, Greensburg, Pennsylvania, USA

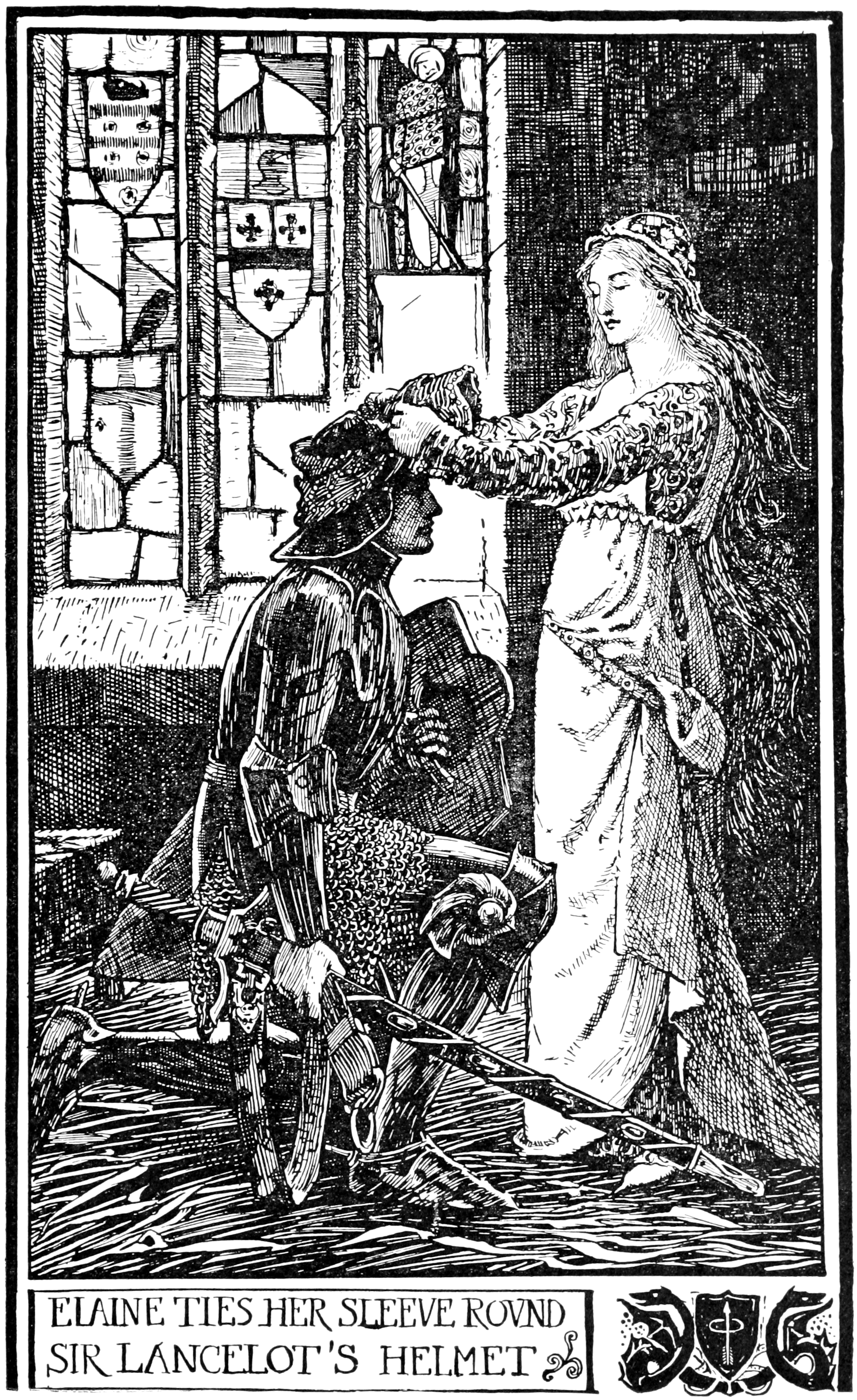
Henry Justice Ford's illustration for Andrew Lang's 1902 The Book of Romance, adapted from Malory

Elaine has captured the imaginations of many painters and illustrators, becoming one of the most recognizable tertiary characters from the Arthurian legends. Artists who have depicted her story include:

- Sophie Gengembre Anderson, Elaine (1873), Walker Art Gallery, Liverpool, UK
- Emilie Autumn
- Walter Crane, The Lady of Shalott (1862), Yale Center for British Art, New Haven, Connecticut, USA
- William Maw Egley, The Lady of Shalott (1858), Sheffield Galleries and Museums Trust, Sheffield, UK
- Henry Justice Ford, 2 illustrations: "Elaine Ties Her Sleeve Round Sir Lancelot's Helmet" and "The Black Barget" (1908, woodcuts) illustration for Tales of the Round Table, Based on the Tales in the Book of Romance (London and New York: Longmans, Green and Company, 1908), pp. 114 & 127.
- Eleanor Fortescue-Brickdale, 5 illustrations of Elaine for a 1911 British edition of Alfred Lord Tennyson's Idylls of the King
- Edward Reginald Frampton, Elaine, the Lady of Shallott (1920), private collection
- Robert Gibb, Elaine (1875)
- John Atkinson Grimshaw, The Lady of Shalott - Version 1 (1875), Yale Center for British Art, New Haven, Connecticut, USA
  - The Lady of Shalott - Version 2 (1877), private collection
  - Elaine (1878), private collection
- Thomas Hovenden, The Death of Elaine (1882), Westmoreland Museum of American Art, Greensburg, Pennsylvania, USA
- William Holman Hunt, The Lady of Shalott (1902), Wadsworth Athenaeum, Hartford, Connecticut, USA
- Edmund Blair Leighton, Elaine (1899), private collection
- Sidney Paget, Lancelot and Elaine (by 1908), Galleria d'Arte Moderna, Florence, Italy
- Howard Pyle, "The Dead Lady Floateth Down Ye Stream Toward Camelot," illustration for an 1881 edition of "The Lady of Shalott"
- "The Boat with the Dead Maiden of Astolat before the Palace at Westminster," (1917), by Arthur Rackman, illustration for Tales of King Arthur and the Knights of the Round Table (1917) by Nelly Montijn
- Louis Rhead, "Elaine Worships Lancelot," illustration for an 1898 edition of Alfred Lord Tennyson, Idylls of the King, New York: R. H. Russell
- Dante Gabriel Rossetti, The Lady of Shalott (1857, woodcut), illustration for an 1857 edition of Tennyson's poetry
- John Byam Liston Shaw, The Lady of Shalott (1898, oil on panel), Middlebury College Museum of Art, Middlebury, Vermont, USA
- Elizabeth Siddal, The Lady of Shalott (1853, pen, black ink, sepia and pencil), The Maas Gallery, London, UK
- Andrew Stoddart, Launcelot and Elaine Window (c.1910), Stained Glass Museum, Ely, Cambridgeshire, UK
- John Melhuish Strudwick, Elaine (1891, oil on canvas), private collection
- John William Waterhouse, The Lady of Shalott (1888), Tate Britain, London, UK
  - The Lady of Shalott Looking at Lancelot (1894, oil on canvas), Leeds Art Gallery, Yorkshire, UK
  - I Am Half-Sick of Shadows, Said the Lady of Shalott (1915), Art Gallery of Ontario, Toronto, Canada
- David Wilkie Wynfield, The Lady of Shalott (1863, oil on canvas), private collection
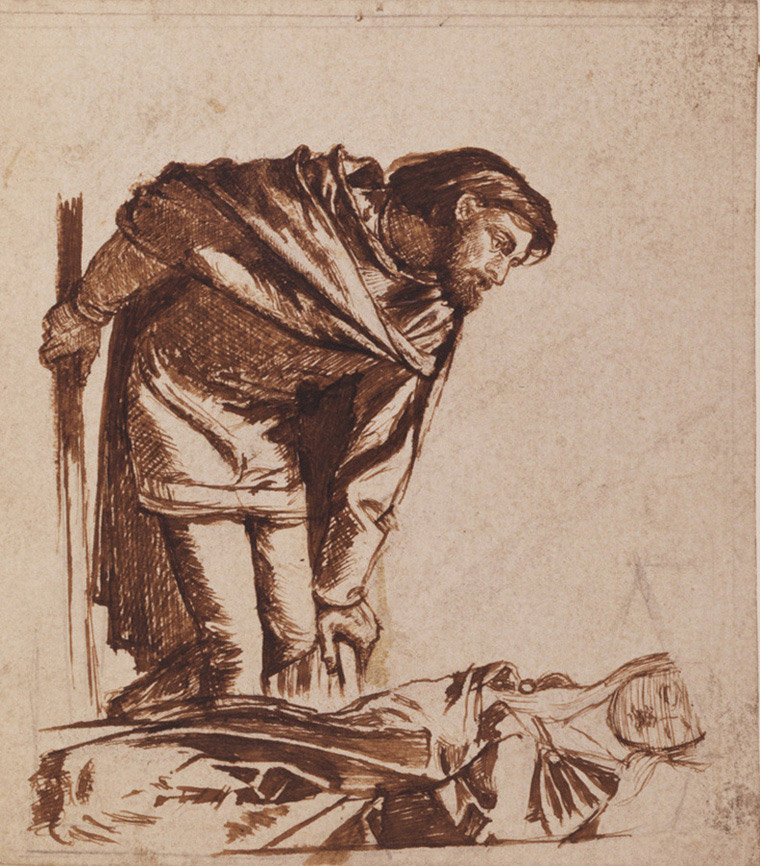
Study for the illustration Lancelot and the Lady of Shalott (c.1856) by Dante Gabriel Rossetti, Delaware Art Museum, USA

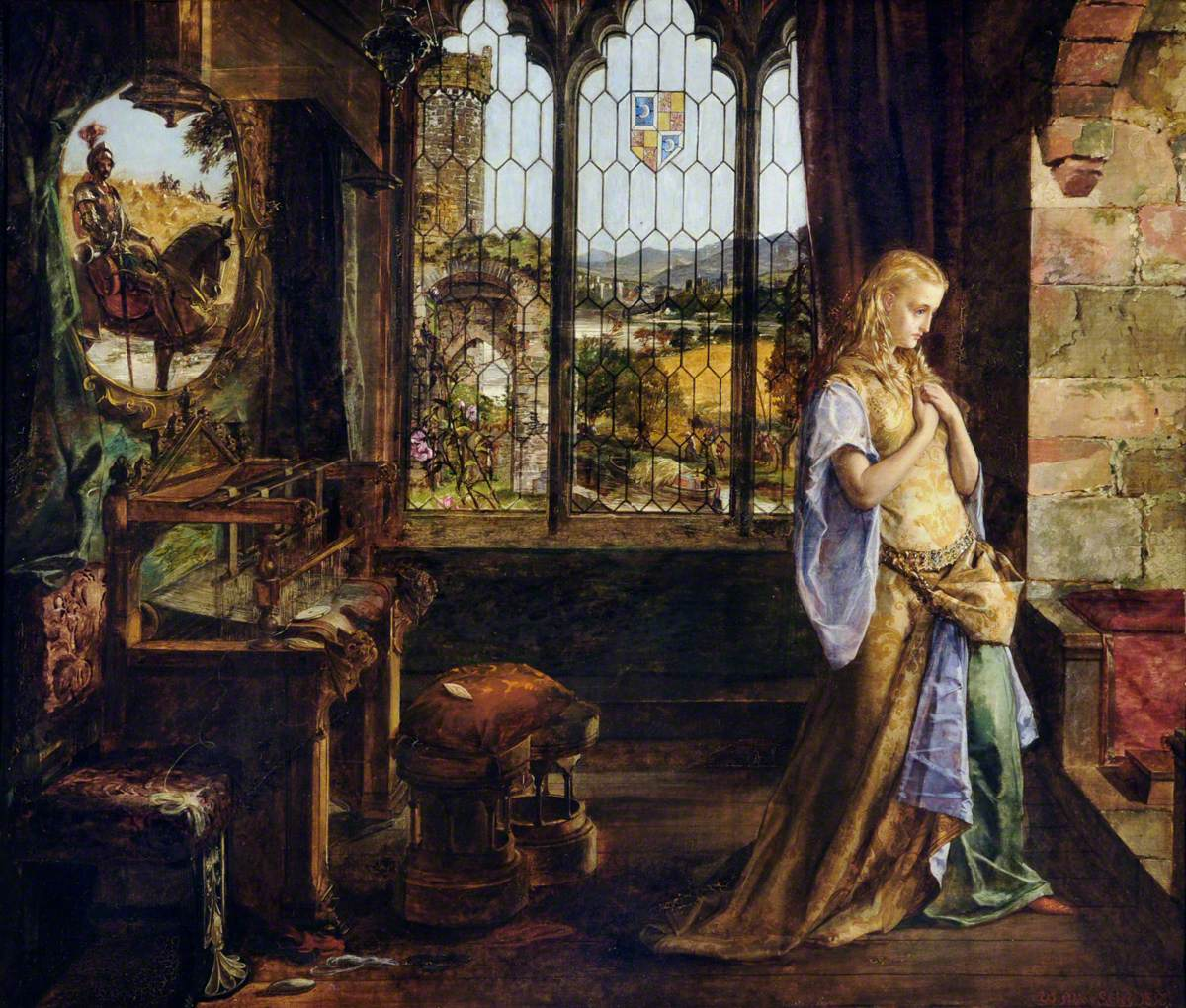
The Lady of Shalott (1858) by William Maw Egley, Sheffield Galleries and Museums Trust, UK

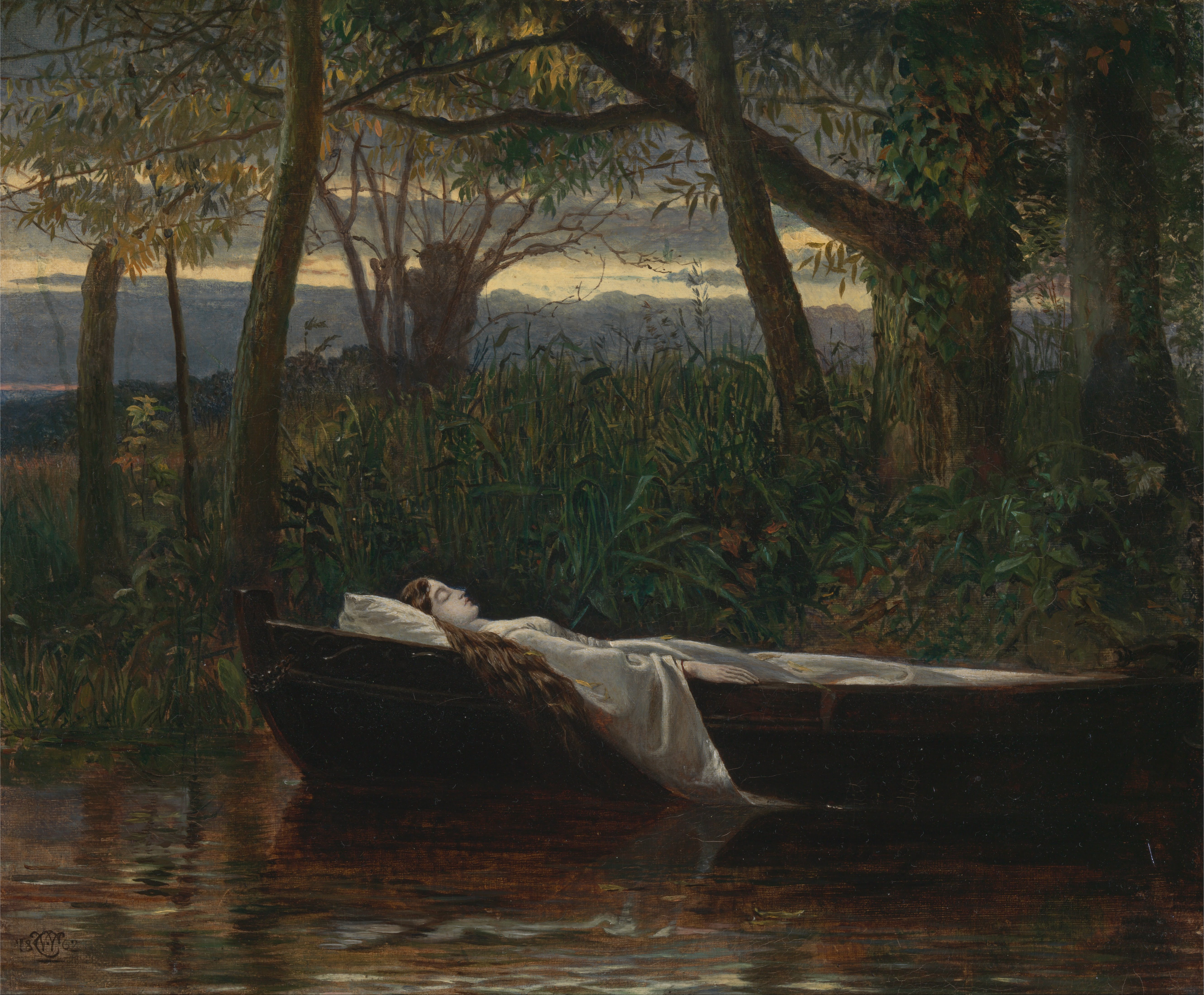
The Lady of Shalott (1862) by Walter Crane, Yale Center for British Art, New Haven, Connecticut, USA

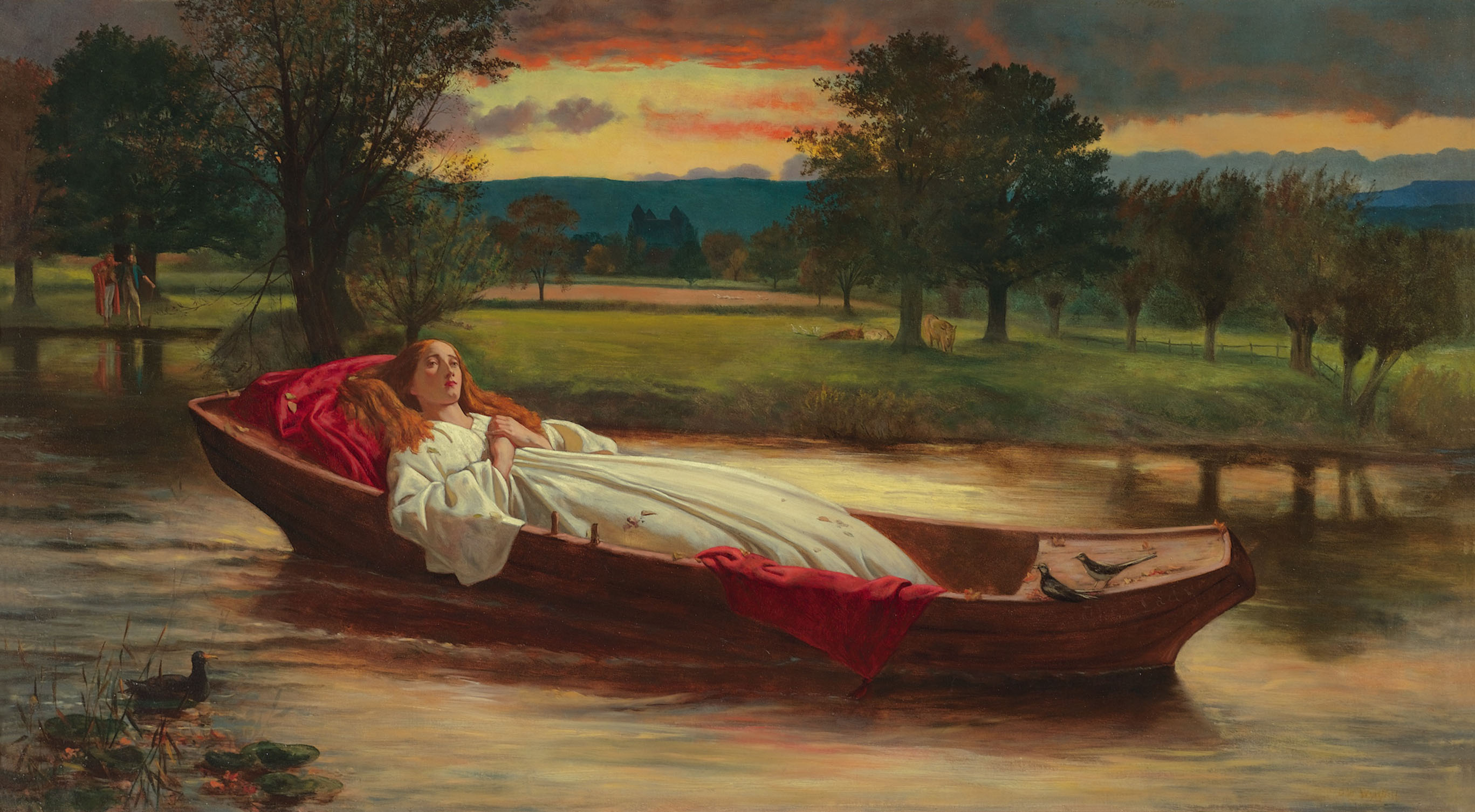
The Lady of Shalott (1863) by David Wilkie Wynfield, private collection

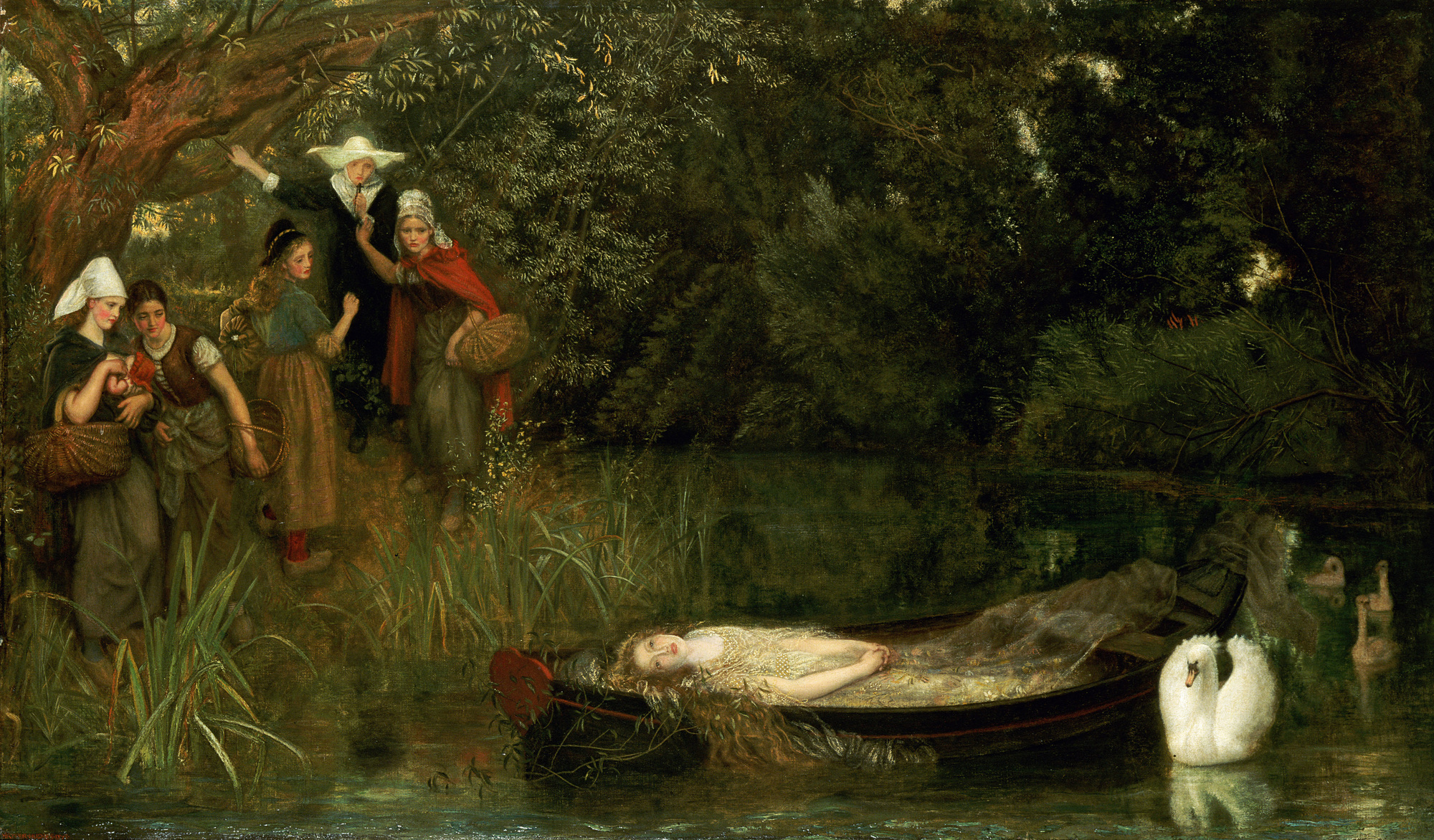
The Lady of Shalott (c.1872-73, oil on canvas), by Arthur Hughes, private collection

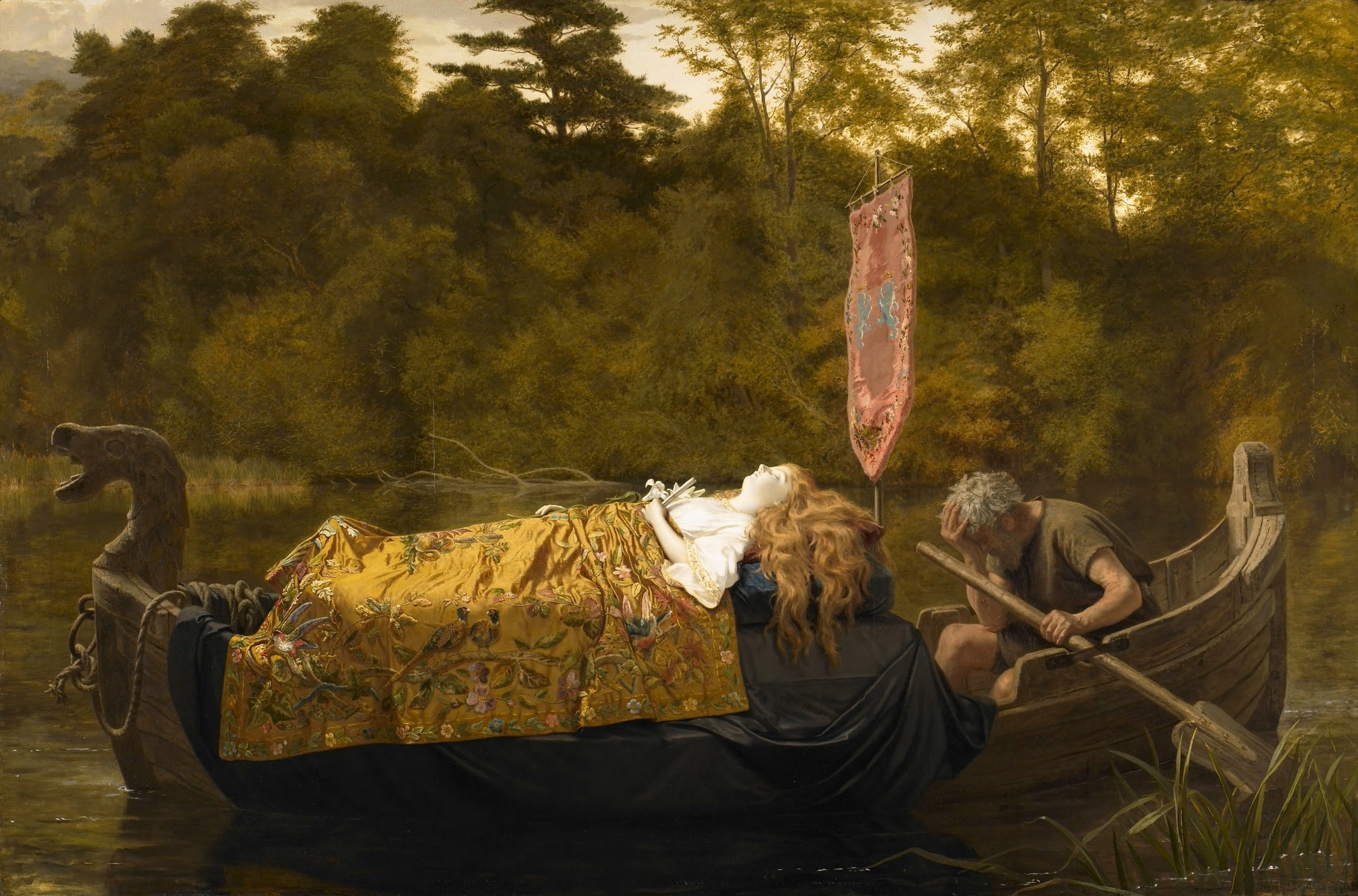
Elaine (1873) by Sophie Gengembre Anderson, Walker Art Gallery, Liverpool, UK

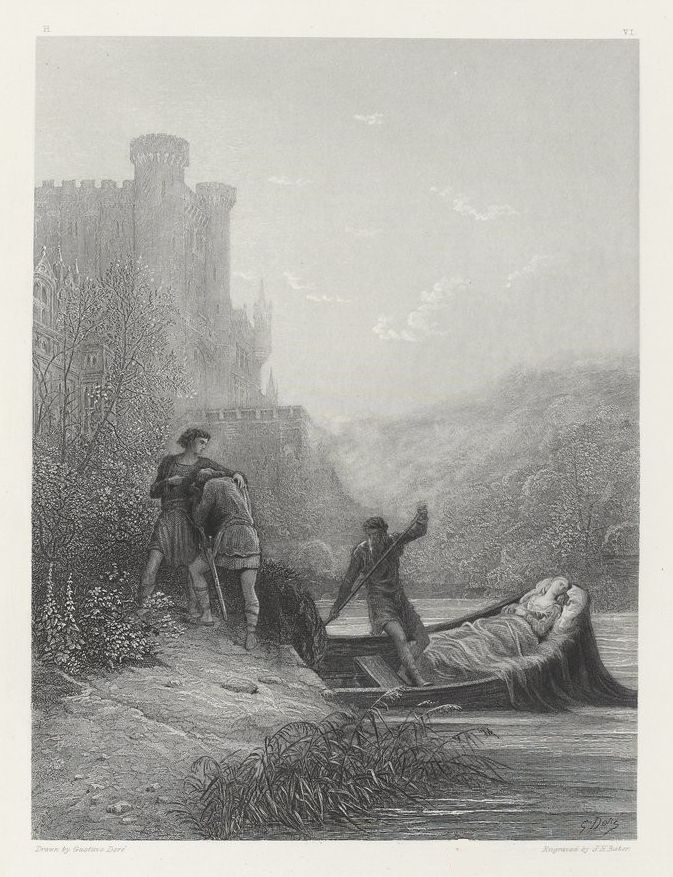
"Elaine" (1875), by Gustave Doré, illustration for Tennyson's Idylls of the King

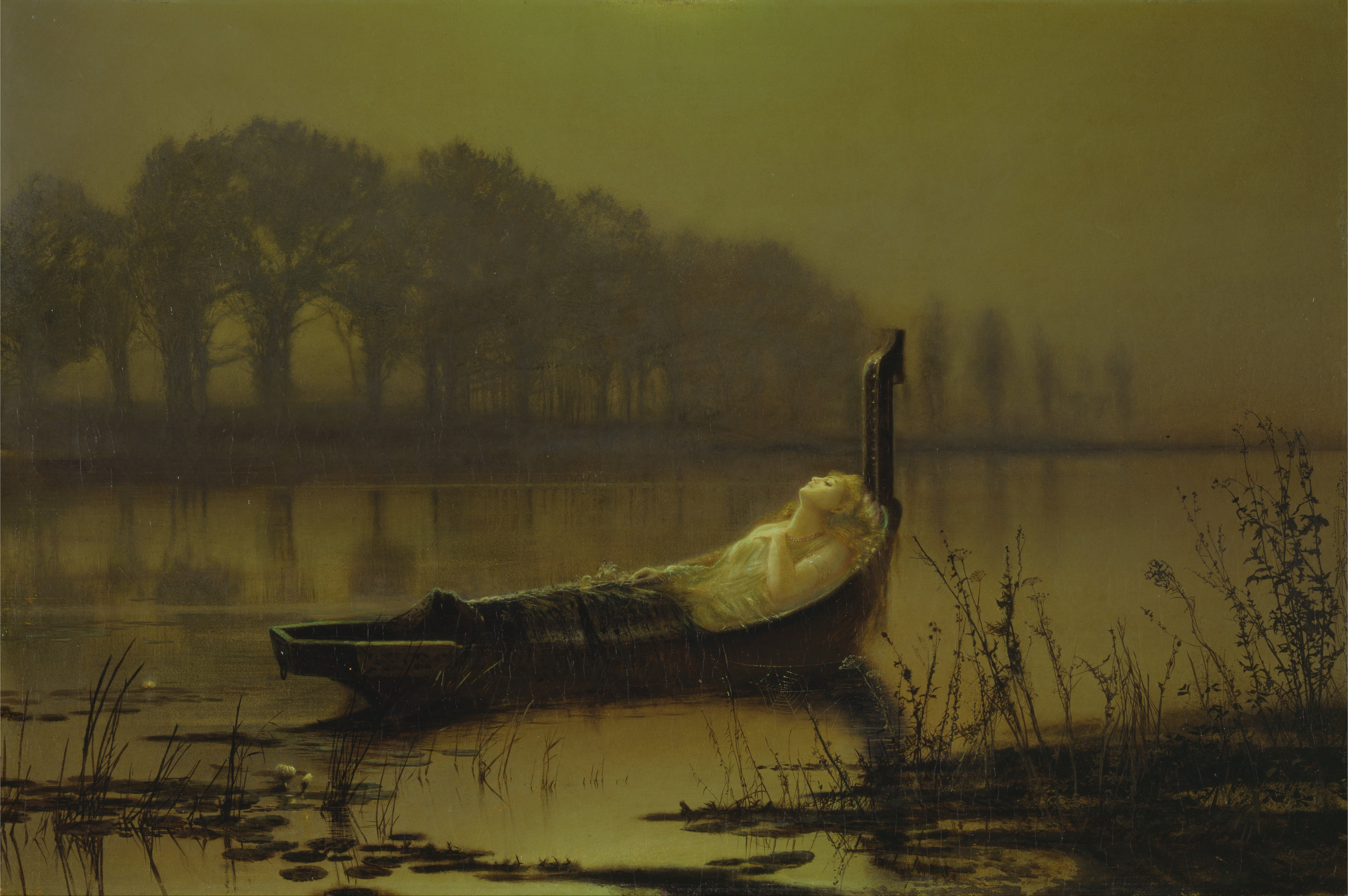
The Lady of Shalott - Version 1 (c.1875) by John Atkinson Grimshaw, Yale Center for British Art, New Haven, Connecticut, USA

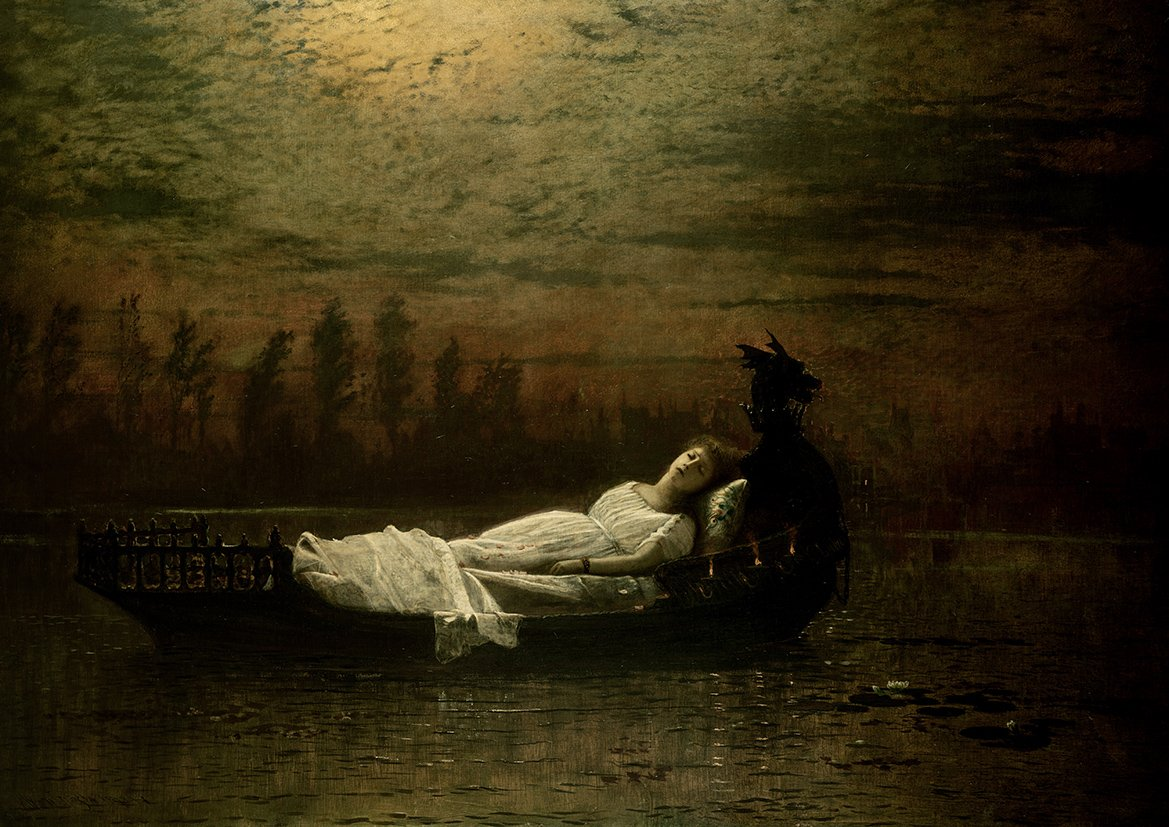
The Lady of Shalott - Version 2 (1877) by John Atkinson Grimshaw, private collection

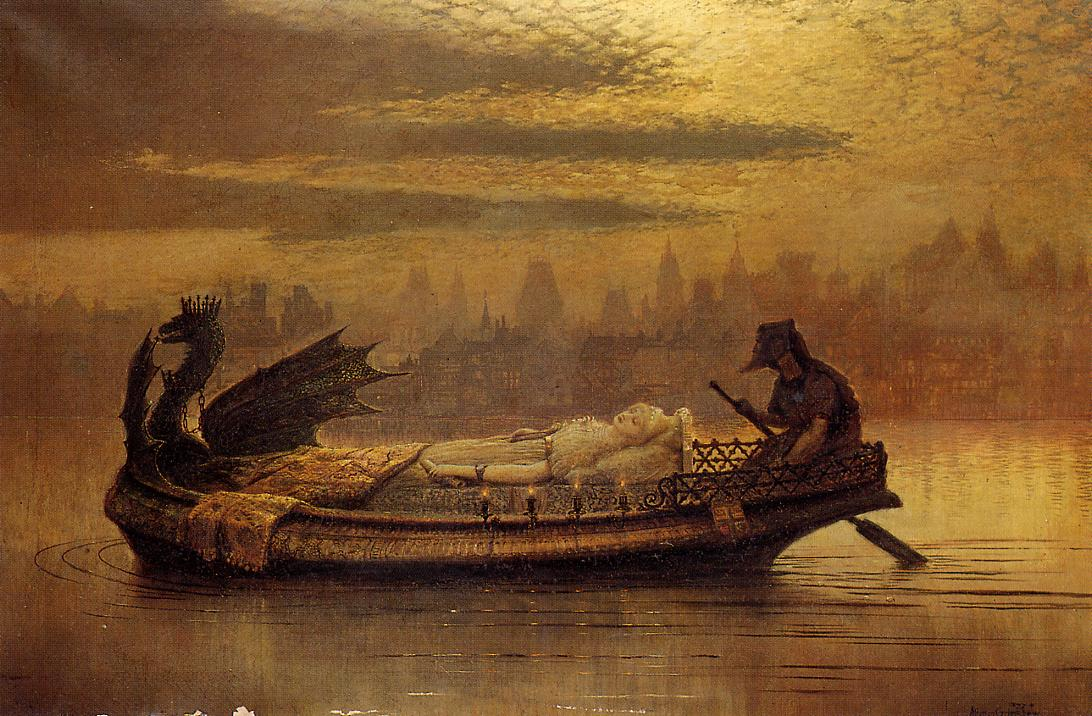
Elaine (1878) by John Atkinson Grimshaw, private collection

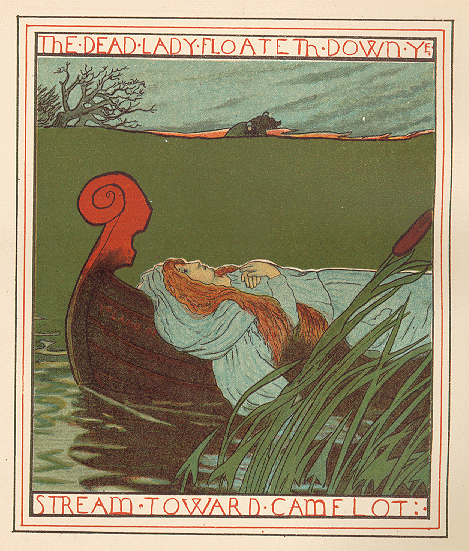
The Dead Lady Floateth Down Ye Stream Toward Camelot (1881) by Howard Pyle, illustration

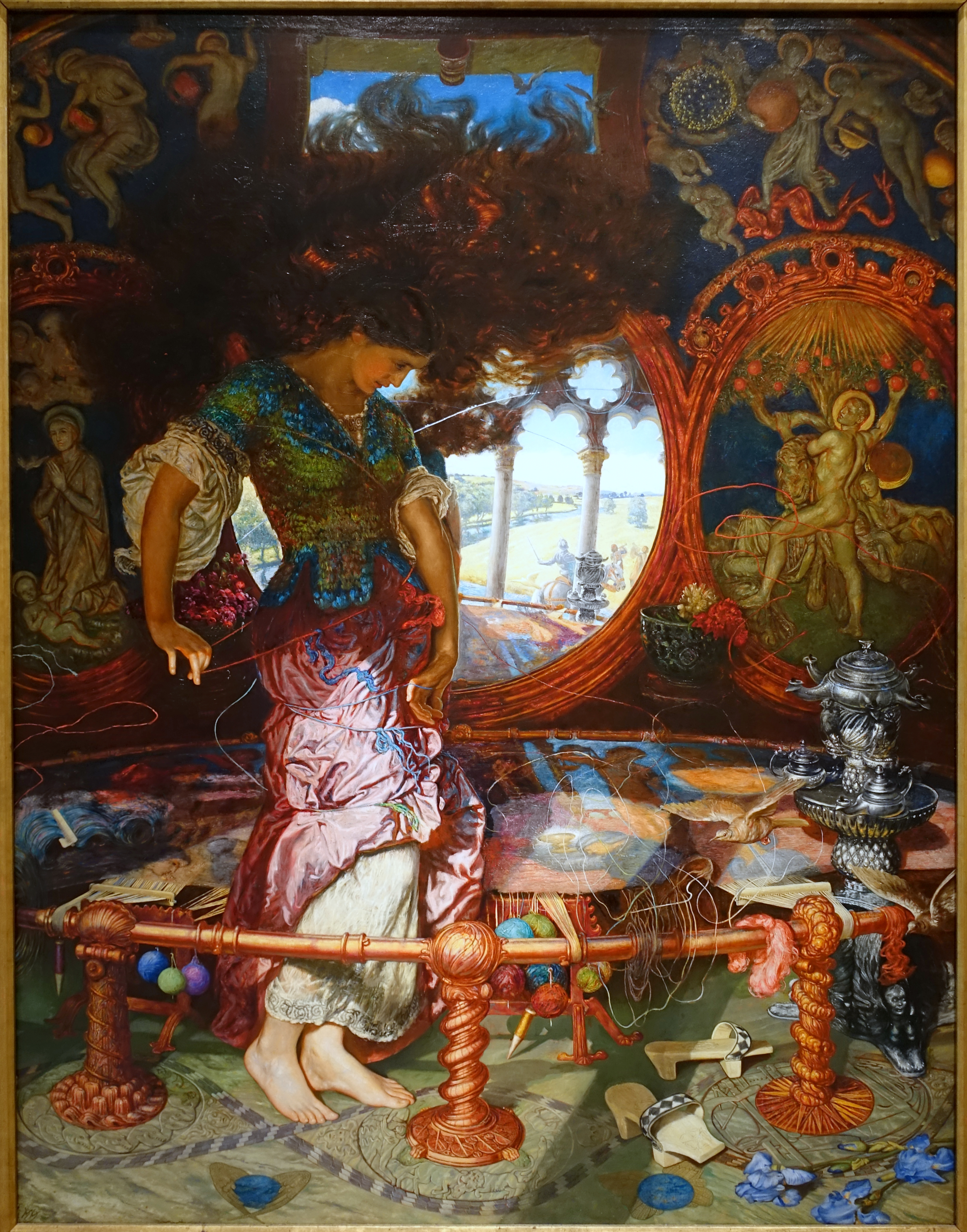
The Lady of Shalott (c.1890, oil on canvas), by William Holman Hunt, Wadsworth Athenaeum, Hartford, Connecticut, USA

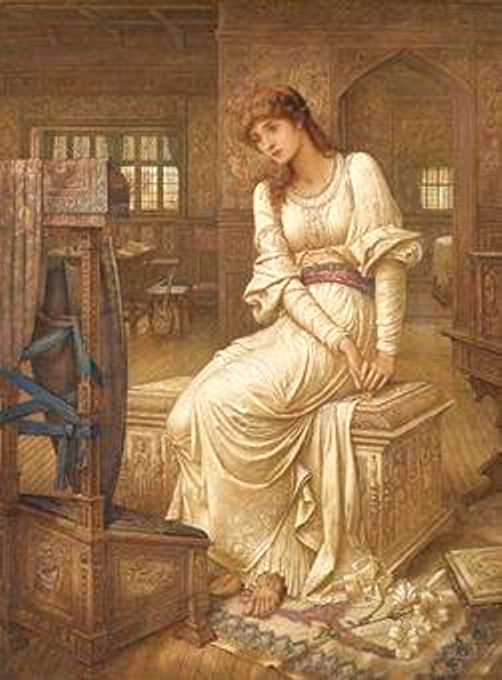
Elaine (1891, oil on canvas), by John Melhuish Strudwick, private collection

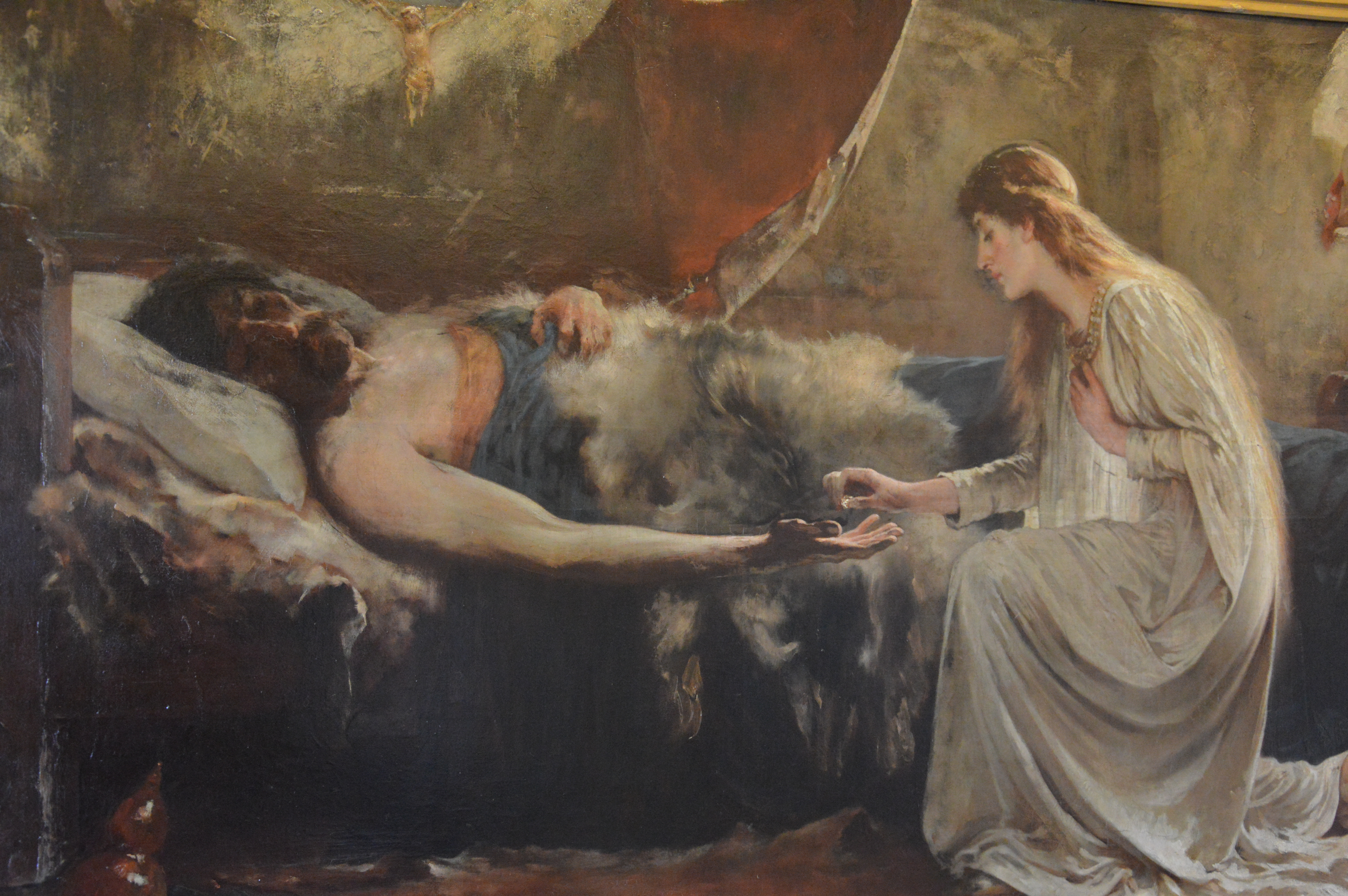
Lancelot and Elaine (c.1891) by Sidney Paget, Galleria d'Arte Moderna, Florence, Italy

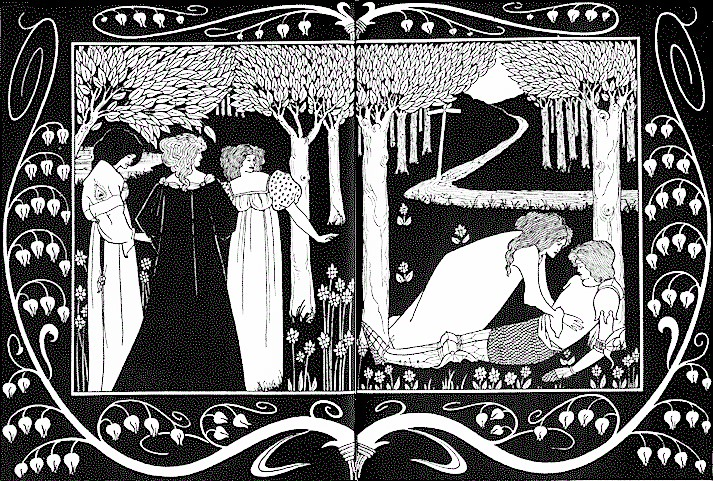
How Sir Launcelot was known by Dame Elaine (1893) by Aubrey Beardsley, illustration

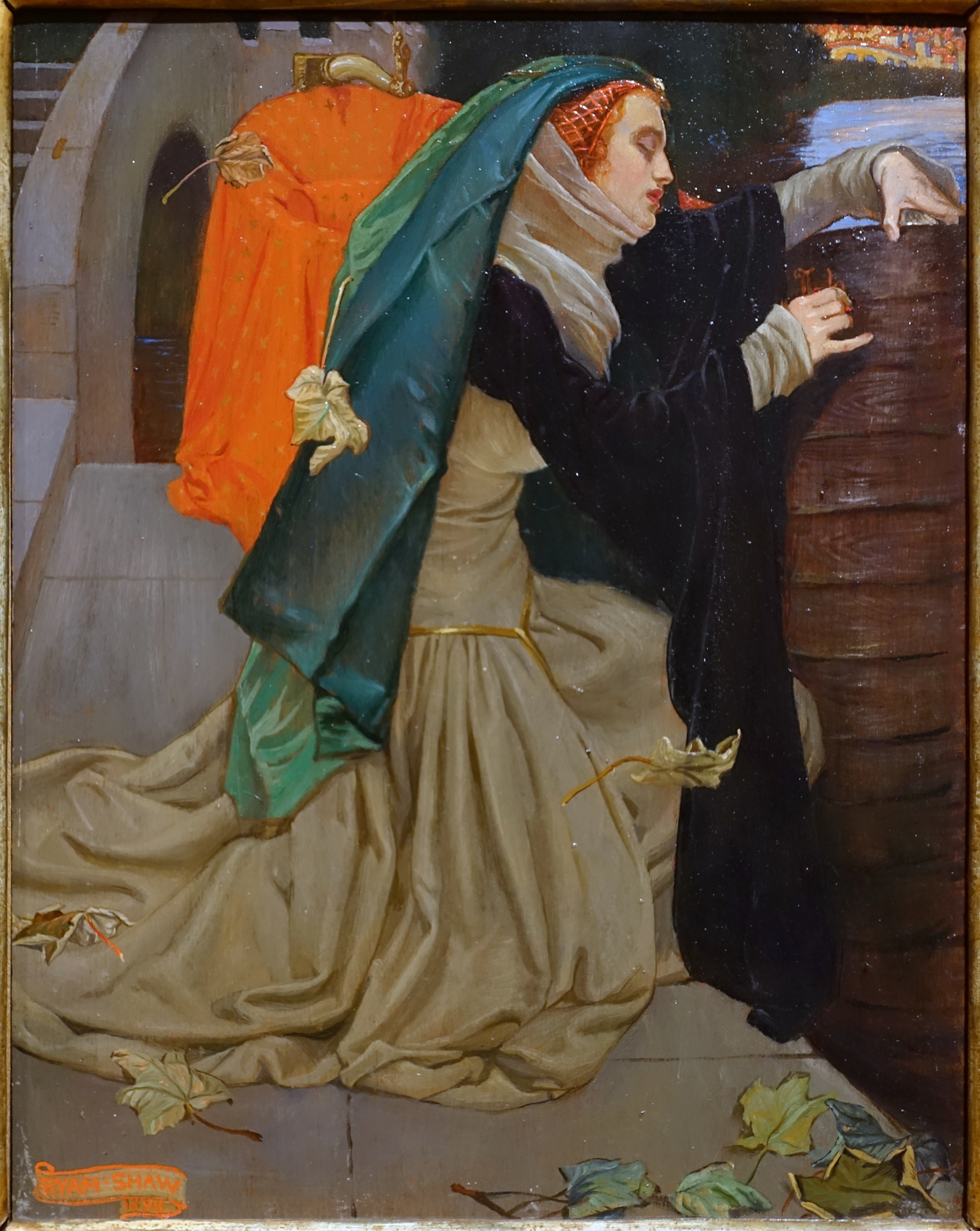
The Lady of Shalott (1898) by John Byam Liston Shaw, Middlebury College Museum of Art, Middlebury, Vermont, USA

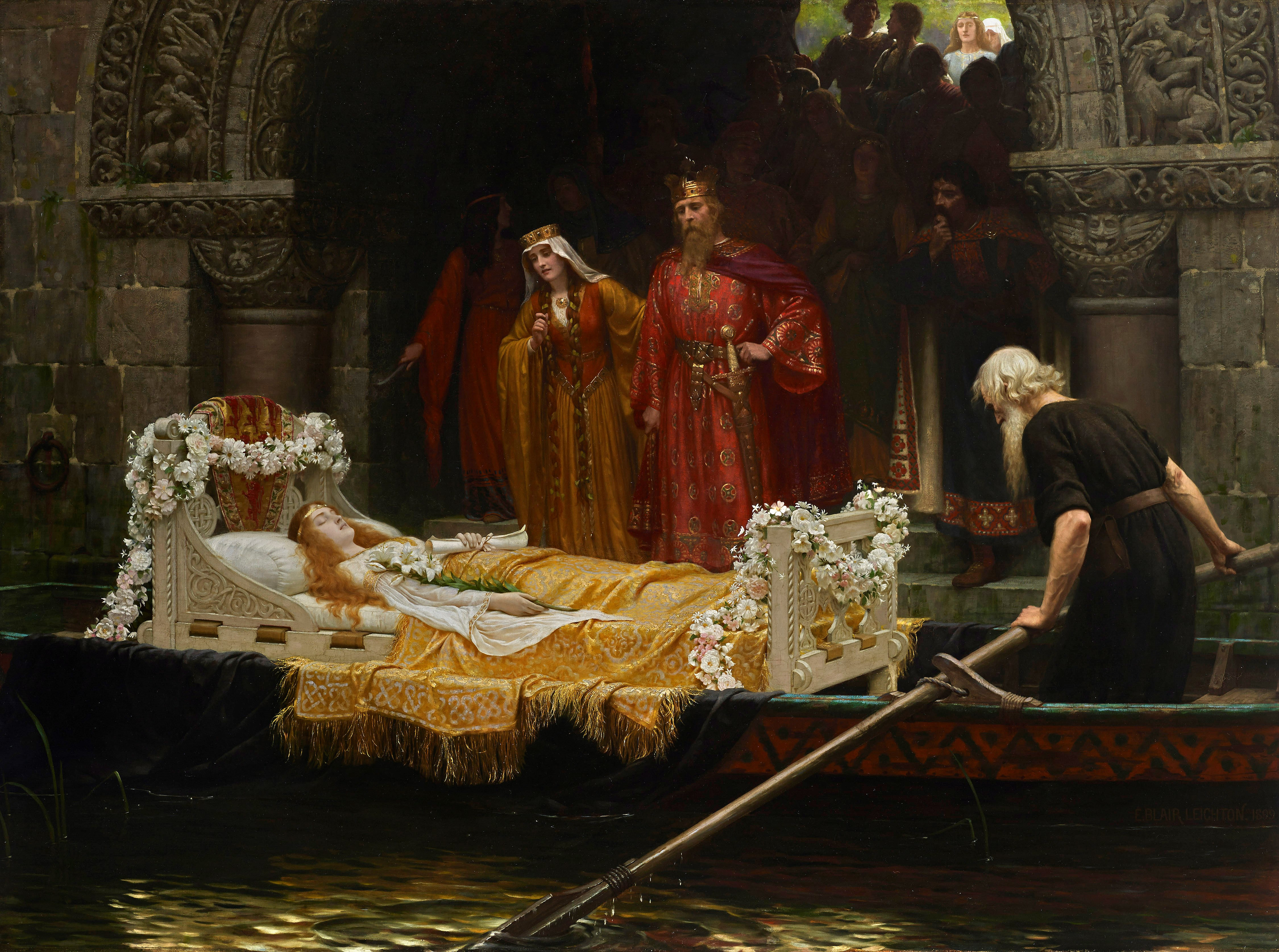
Elaine (1899) by Edmund Blair Leighton, private collection

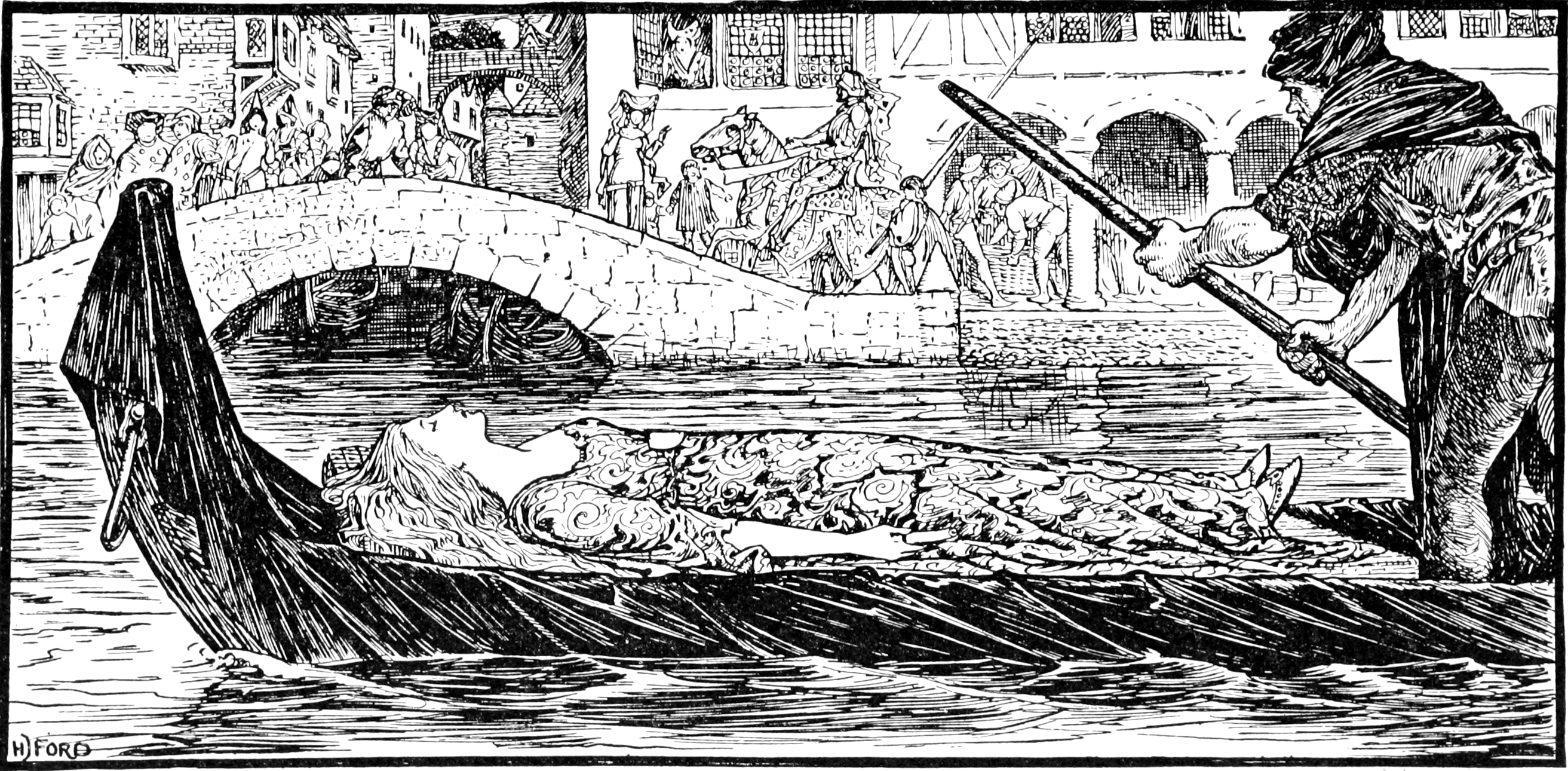
The Black Barget (1902) by Henry Justice Ford, woodcut illustration

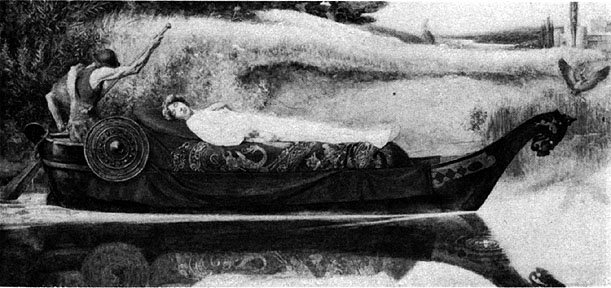
Elaine (by 1906) by Charles Edwin Fripp, illustration

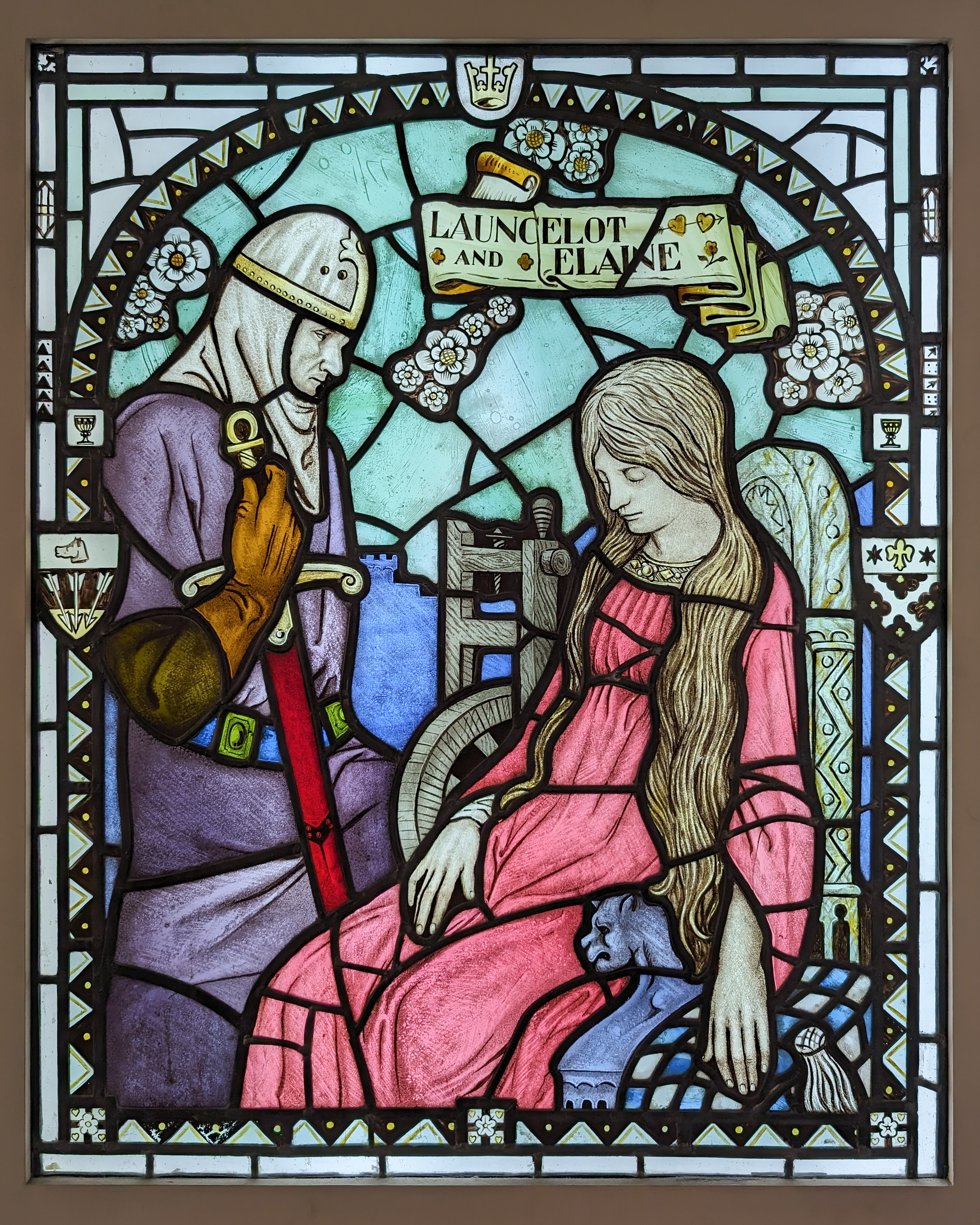
Launcelot and Elaine Window (c.1910), by Andrew Stoddart, Stained Glass Museum, Ely, Cambridgeshire, UK

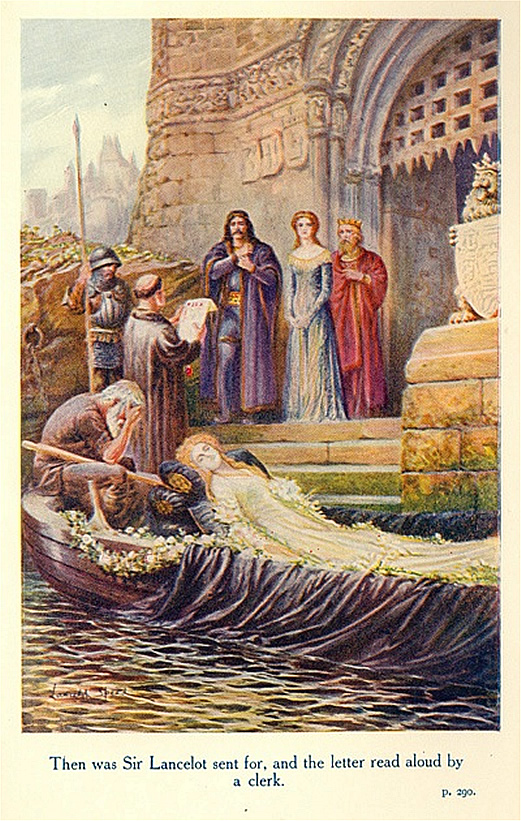
Elaine of Astolat (1912), by Lancelot Speed, illustration for The Legends of King Arthur and His Knights (1912)

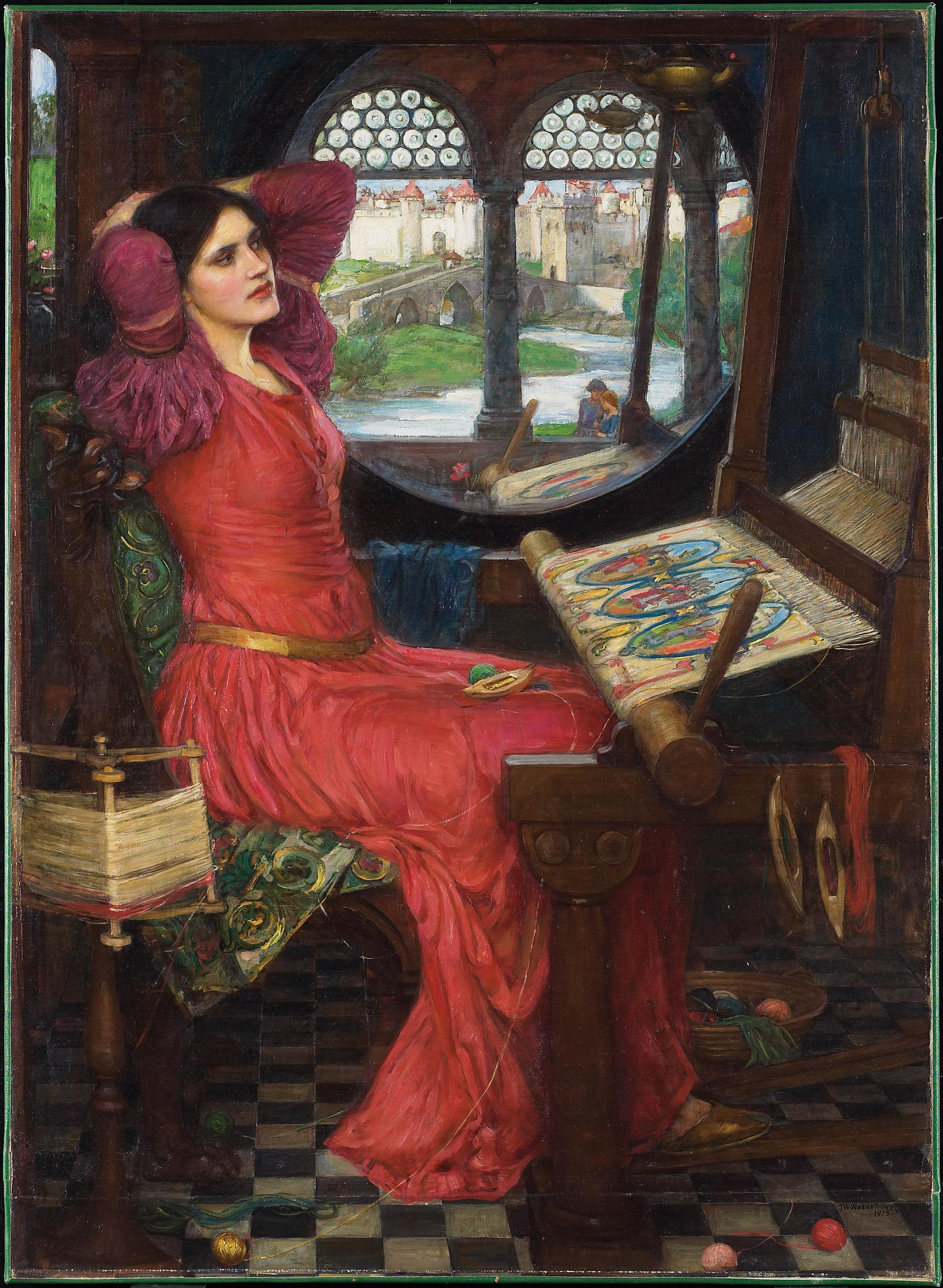
I Am Half-Sick of Shadows (1915), by John William Waterhouse, Art Gallery of Ontario

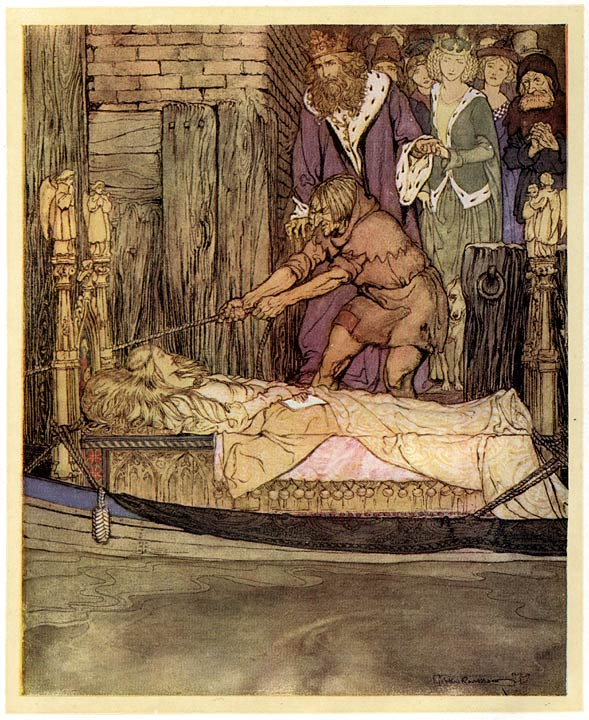
The Boat with the Dead Maiden of Astolat before the Palace at Westminster. (1917), by Arthur Rackman

=== Literary adaptations ===
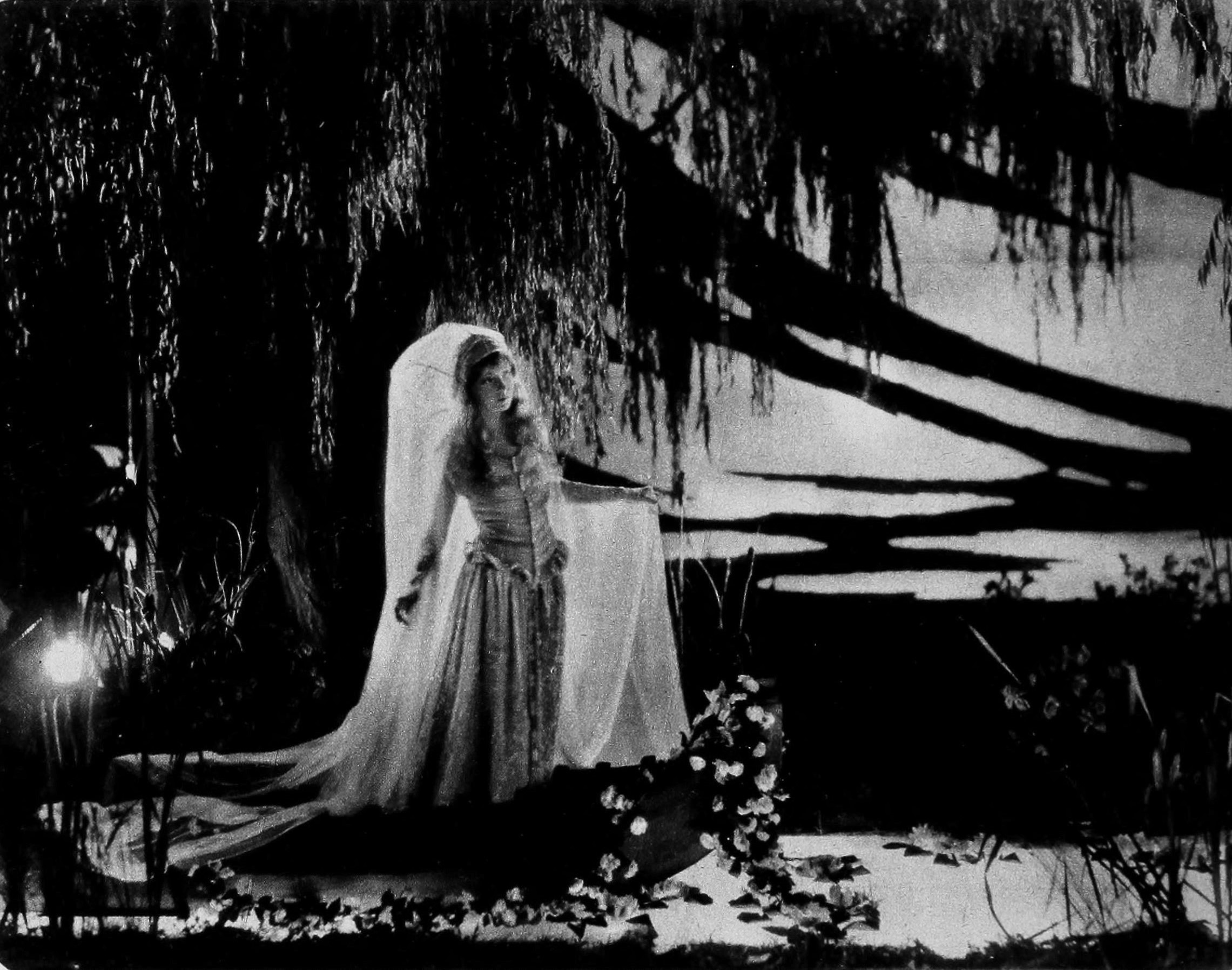
Lillian Gish posed as "The Lily Maid of Shadows" (a line from Tennyson's "Lancelot and Elaine") in a publicity photo for the silent film Way Down East (1920)

- Adams, Oscar Fay, "The Water Carriers" (1886)
- Akhurst, W. M., Arthur the King
- Baring, Maurice, "The Camelot Jousts" (1910)
- Cabot, Meg, Avalon High (a modern adaptation) (2005)
- Fowler Wright, S., "The Ballad of Elaine"
- Hamley, Edward Bruce, "Sir Tray: An Arthurian Idyl" (1873)
- Kay, Guy Gavriel's, The Fionavar Tapestry [through the character of the lios alfar ("light elf") Leyse]
- Kilmer, Aline Murray, "For All Ladies of Shalott" (1921)
- Landon, Letitia Elizabeth, "A Legend of Tintagel Castle" (1833)
- Lang, Andrew, The Lady of Shalott (1888)
- Meredith, Owen, "Elayne le Blanc" (1875)
- Millay, Edna St. Vincent, "Elaine" (1921)
- Nieman, Valerie, "Elaine the Fair Accuses Lancelot" (2007)
- Phelps, Elizabeth Stuart, "Elaine and Elaine" (1883), "The Lady of Shalott" (1871)
- Rhodes, William Henry, "Rosenthal's Elaine" (1876)
- Sandell, Lisa Ann, Song of the Sparrow (2007)
- Sebastian, Laura, Half Sick of Shadows (2021)
- Steynor, Morley, Lancelot and Elaine: A Play in Five Acts (1909)
- Stoddard, Elizzle, "Before the Mirror" (1895)
- Tennyson, Alfred, Lord, "The Lady of Shalott" (1833, 1842) and "Lancelot and Elaine" in the Idylls of the King (1859)
- White, T.H., The Once and Future King (1958)

=== In other works ===
- A character based on Elaine of Astolat appears in Nakaba Suzuki's 2012 manga series The Seven Deadly Sins. However despite having the same name, this Elaine is actually the wife of Ban and mother of Lancelot
- A magically immortal Elaine of Astolat appears in the 2025 television series "The Librarians: The Next Chapter", part of The Librarian franchise, as one of the caretakers of the titular Library, alongside several other Arthurian characters. She is played by Caroline Loncq.

== See also ==
- Elaine (legend)
