= Shalott (disambiguation) =

Shalott most commonly refers to:

- Shalott, an island in the poem The Lady of Shalott (1833 and 1842) by Alfred, Lord Tennyson
- "Shalott", a song on Emilie Autumn's album Opheliac (2006), based on Tennyson's poem

Shalott may be a misspelling of:

- Shallot, a root vegetable similar to the onion

== See also ==
- The Lady of Shalott (Waterhouse), a 1888 painting by John William Waterhouse
- The Lady of Shalott (William Holman Hunt), a 1905 painting by William Holman Hunt
