= I Am Half-Sick of Shadows, Said the Lady of Shalott =

Painting by John William Waterhouse

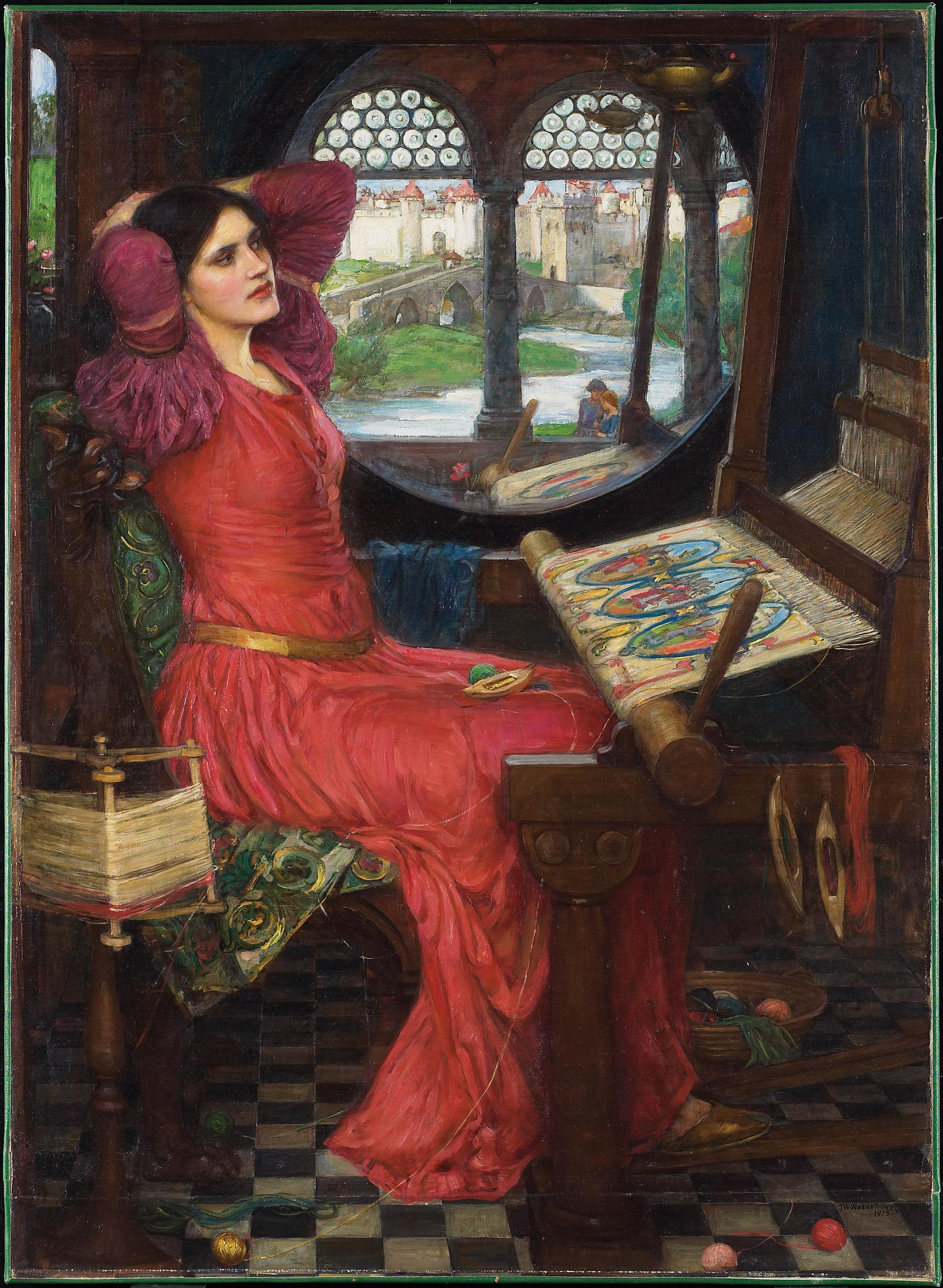
- Artist: John William Waterhouse
- Year: 1915
- Medium: Oil on canvas
- Dimensions: 100.3 cm × 73.3 cm (39.5 in × 28.9 in)
- Location: Art Gallery of Ontario, Toronto

I Am Half-Sick of Shadows, Said the Lady of Shalott is a painting by John William Waterhouse completed in 1915. It is the third painting by Waterhouse that depicts a scene from the Tennyson poem, "The Lady of Shalott". The title of the painting is a quotation from the last two lines in the fourth and final verse of the second part of Tennyson's poem:

But in her web she still delights
To weave the mirror’s magic sights,
For often thro’ the silent nights
A funeral, with plumes and lights
And music, came from Camelot:
Or when the moon was overhead
Came two young lovers lately wed;
'I am half sick of shadows,' said
The Lady of Shalott.

This painting depicts an earlier point in the tale of the Lady of Shalott than those depicted by Waterhouse in his previous two works of 1888 and 1894; the Lady is still confined in her tower, weaving a tapestry, viewing the world outside only through the reflection in the large mirror in the background. In the painting, the mirror reveals a bridge over a river leading to the walls and towers of Camelot; also visible nearby are a man and a woman, perhaps the "two young lovers lately wed" referred to in Tennyson's poem. The scene is set shortly before an image of Lancelot appears in the mirror, enticing the Lady out of her tower to her death.

The painting shows the Lady of Shalott resting from her weaving.

The lady wears a red dress, in a room with Romanesque columns holding up the arches of the window reflected in the mirror. The frame of the loom and the geometric tiles of the floor lead the viewer into the room, where reds, yellows and blues echo the more vivid colours outside. A single poppy can be seen reflected in the mirror. The shuttles of the loom resemble boats, foreshadowing the Lady's death.

The painting was exhibited at the Royal Academy Summer Exhibition in 1916. It was sold from the estate of the accountant John George Griffiths CVO at Hampton's in 1923 for 300 guineas, and passed through the hands of the art dealer Arthur de Casseres. It was owned by Mr and Mrs Frederick Cowan, and inherited by their great-niece, the wife of Canadian engineer Philip Berney Jackson, who donated to the Art Gallery of Ontario in 1971.

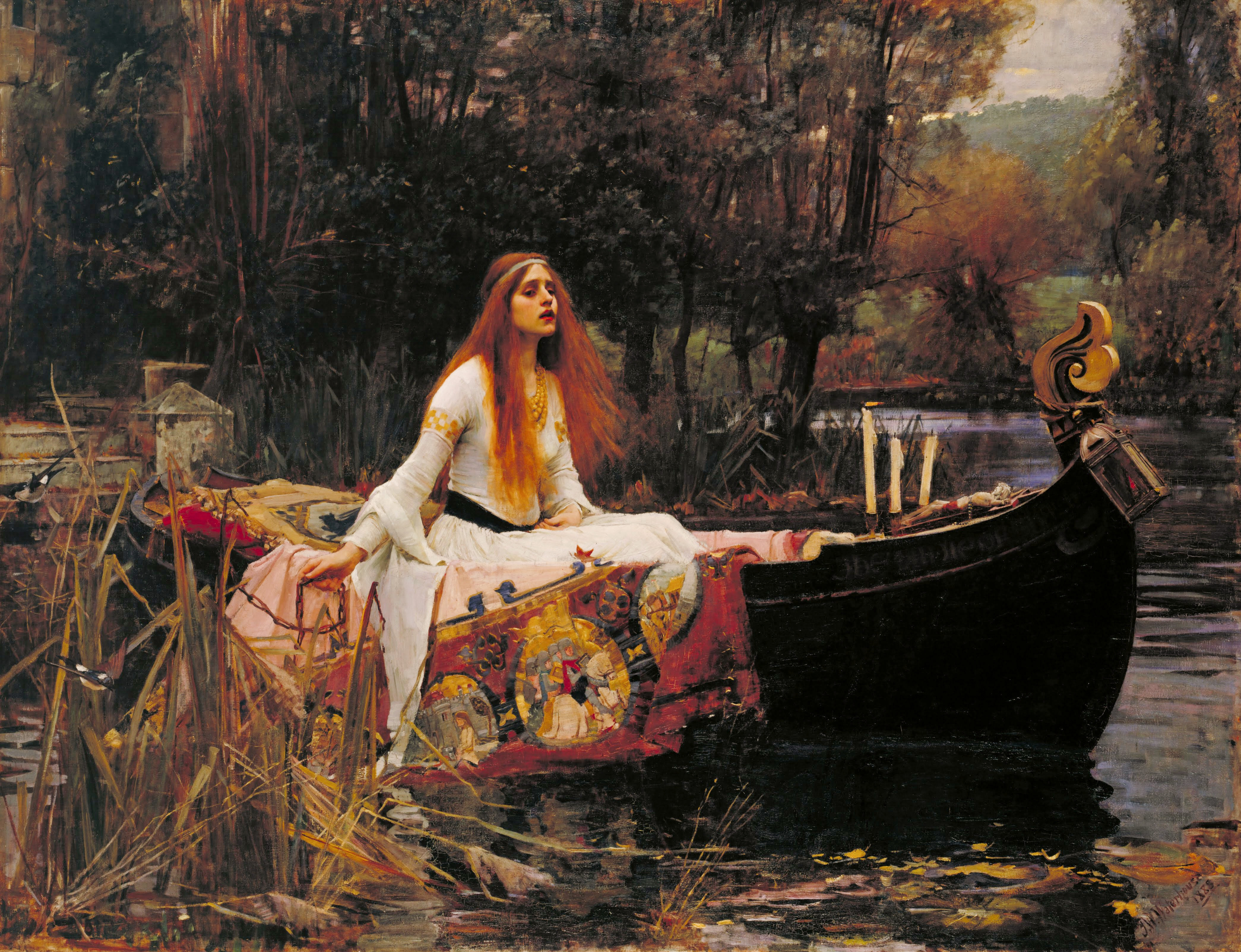
The Lady of Shalott, 1888
Tate Britain, London

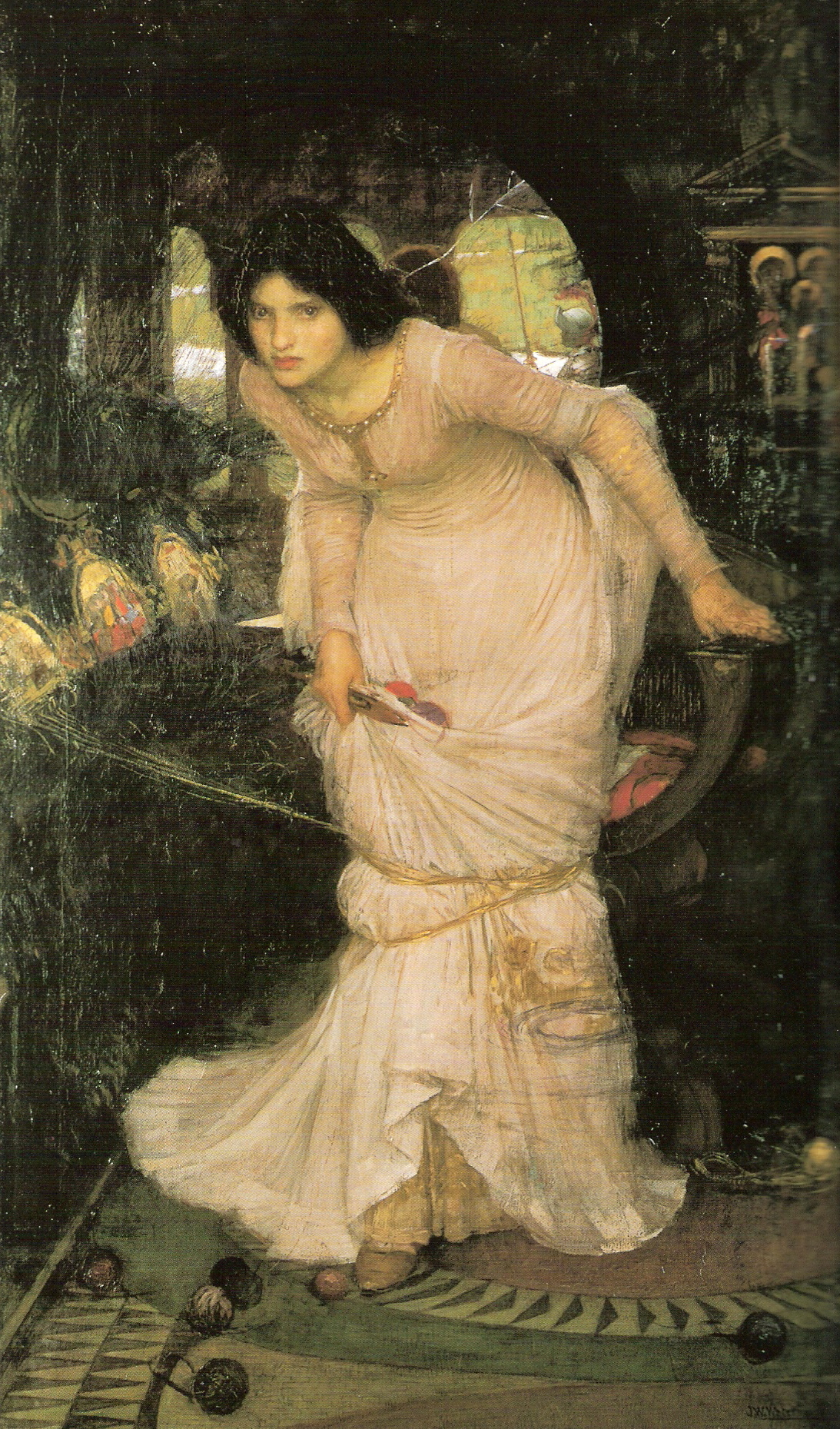
The Lady of Shalott Looking at Lancelot, 1894
Leeds City Art Gallery
