= Astolat =

Town and castle from Arthurian legends

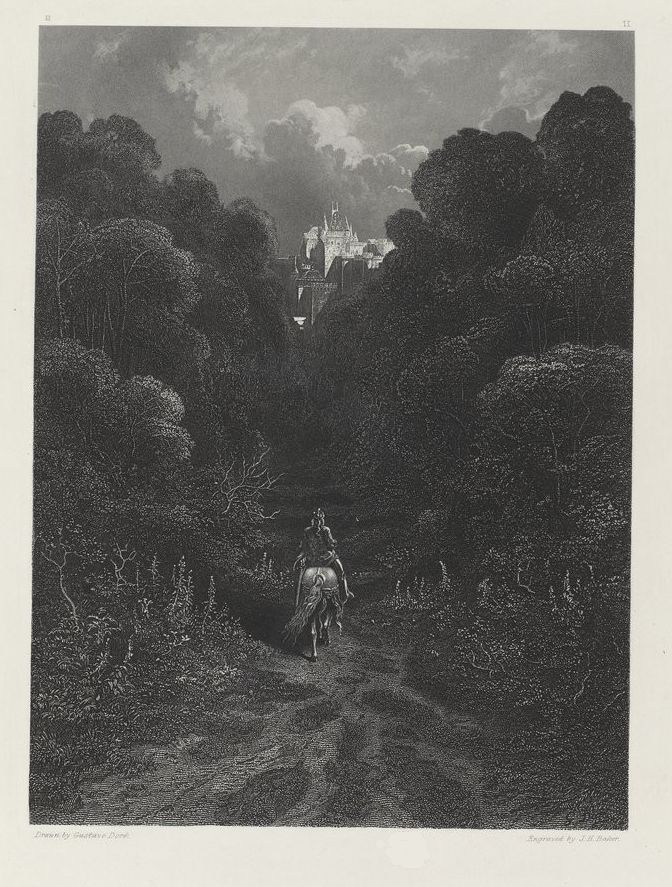
A road to Shalott in Gustave Doré's 1867 illustration for Tennyson

Astolat (/ˈæstəˌlæt, -ˌlɑːt/; French: Escalot) is a legendary castle and town of Great Britain named in Arthurian legends. It is the home of Elaine, "the lily maid of Astolat", as well of her father Sir Bernard and her brothers Lavaine and Tirre. It is known as Shalott in many modern cultural references, derived from Alfred Lord Tennyson's poem "The Lady of Shalott". In the Lancelot-Grail it was said to be upstream of Camelot.

It is also called Ascolat in the Winchester Manuscript of Thomas Malory's English compilation Le Morte d'Arthur. Malory identified the legendary location with his contemporary castle and town of Guildford in England.

== Sources ==
- Sir Thomas Malory - Le Morte d'Arthur
- Michael Fulford, City of the Dead: the Roman Town of Calleva Atrebatum
