= The Lady of Shalott Looking at Lancelot =

Painting by John William Waterhouse

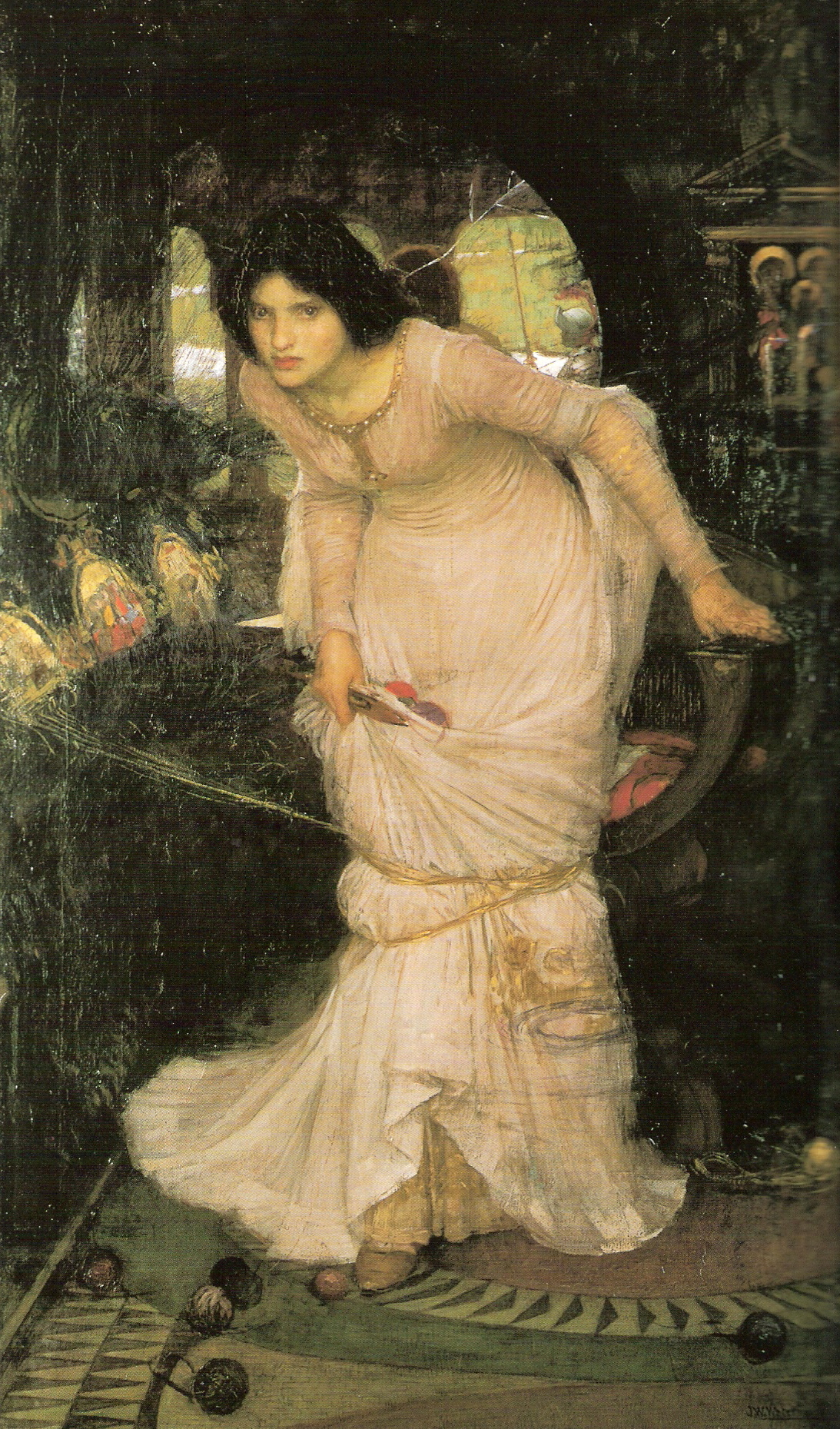
- Artist: John William Waterhouse
- Year: 1894
- Medium: Oil on canvas
- Dimensions: 144.2 cm × 86.3 cm (56.8 in × 34.0 in)
- Location: Leeds Art Gallery, West Yorkshire

The Lady of Shalott Looking at Lancelot is an oil-on-canvas painting by John William Waterhouse, completed in 1894. It measures 142.2 by 86.3 centimetres (56.0 in × 34.0 in). The artist presented it to Leeds Art Gallery in 1895.

== Description ==
This is the second of three major paintings by Waterhouse that depicts scenes from the 1832 Alfred, Lord Tennyson poem, "The Lady of Shalott", between the first – The Lady of Shalott – in 1888 and the third – I Am Half-Sick of Shadows, Said the Lady of Shalott – in 1915.

In Tennyson's poem, the Lady is confined to a tower on an island near Camelot, cursed not to leave the tower or look out of its windows. She weaves a tapestry, viewing the outside world only through reflections in a mirror behind her. The painting depicts the pivotal scene in the third part of the poem: the Lady spies "bold Sir Launcelot" in her mirror: the sight of the handsome knight and the sound of him singing draws her away from her loom to the window, golden yarn still clinging around her knees, bringing down the curse upon her as "the mirror crack'd from side to side". She leaves the tower to take a boat across the river, but meets her death before she reaches Camelot.

The cracked mirror reveals part of the scene, echoing a device used in William Holman Hunt's 1853 painting The Awakening Conscience and also in Hunt's version of The Lady of Shalott (1888–1905).

The Victoria and Albert Museum holds Waterhouse's sketchbook with preliminary drawings for his 1888 and 1894 paintings of the Lady of Shalott. A study is held by Falmouth Art Gallery. An oil sketch for the painting was sold after his death in 1917 and disappeared. It was rediscovered in 2003 in Iceland, having been bought in London by a fisherman many years before. It was shown in a photograph of Waterhouse held by the National Portrait Gallery, and differs in some ways from the final painting, in which the lady wears a white dress: the dress is red in the sketch. Waterhouse chose a red dress for his third painting of the Lady of Shalott, I Am Half-Sick of Shadows, Said the Lady of Shalott. The sketch was sold in 2003.

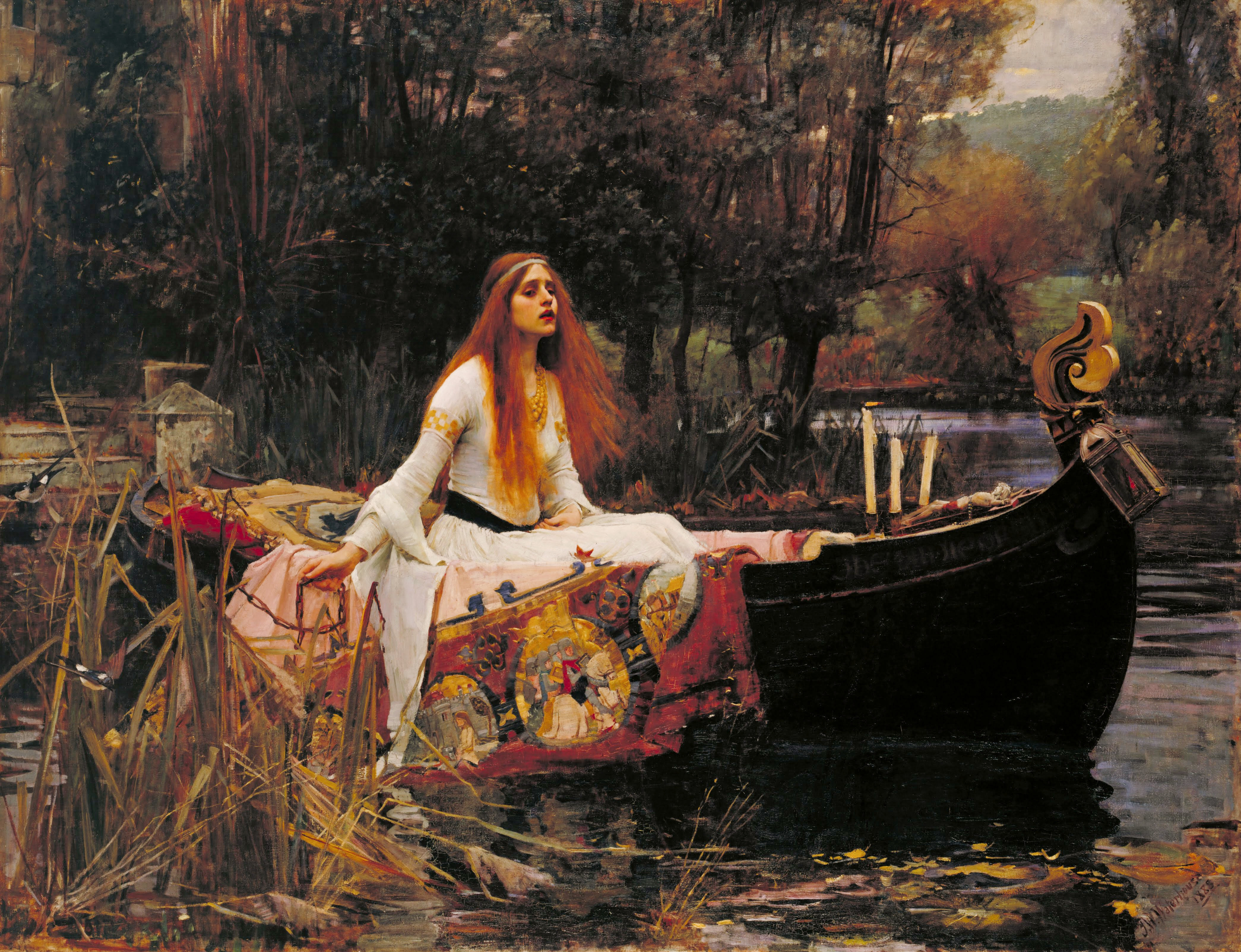
The Lady of Shalott, 1888
Tate Britain, London

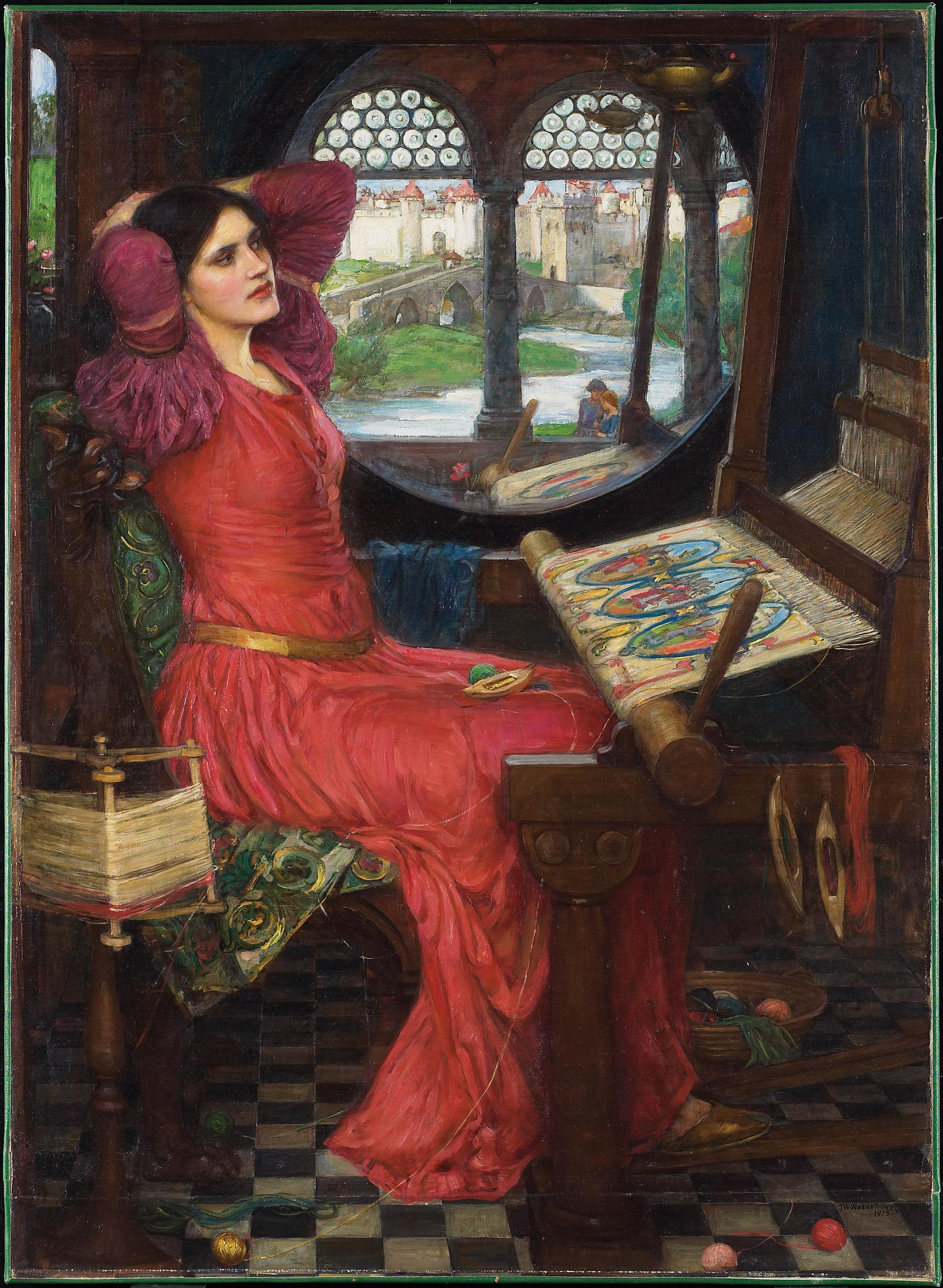
I Am Half-Sick of Shadows, Said the Lady of Shalott, 1915
Art Gallery of Ontario

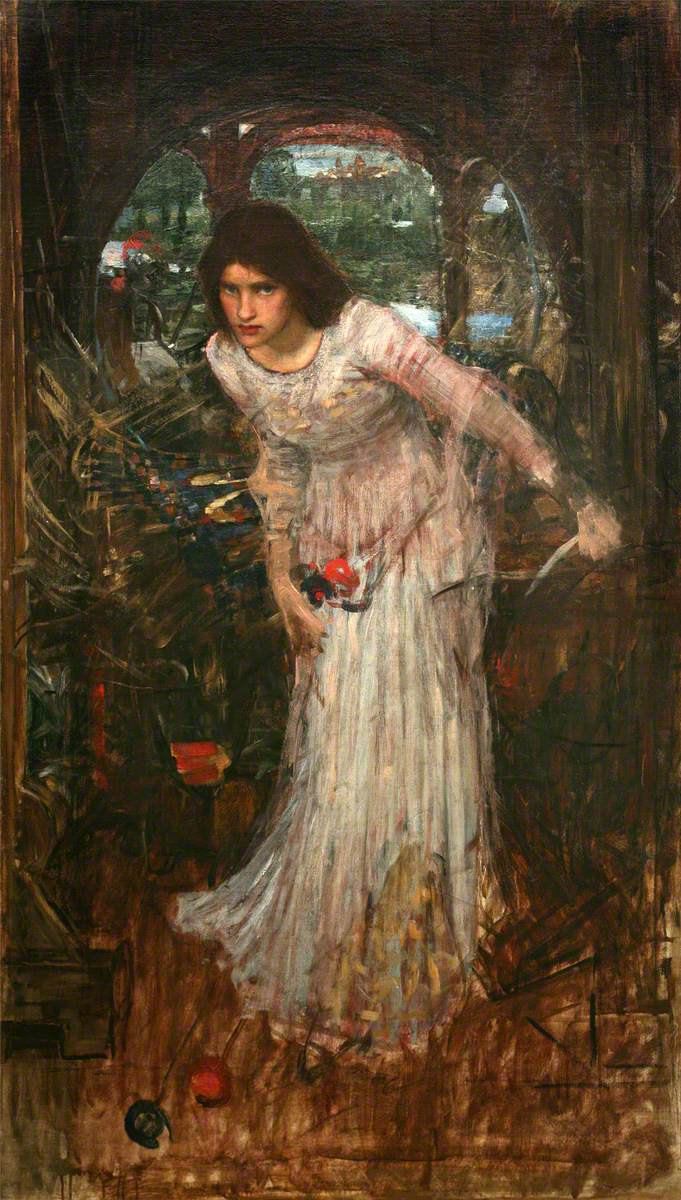
Study, 1894
Falmouth Art Gallery
