= The Lady of Shalott (Waterhouse) =

1888 painting by John William Waterhouse

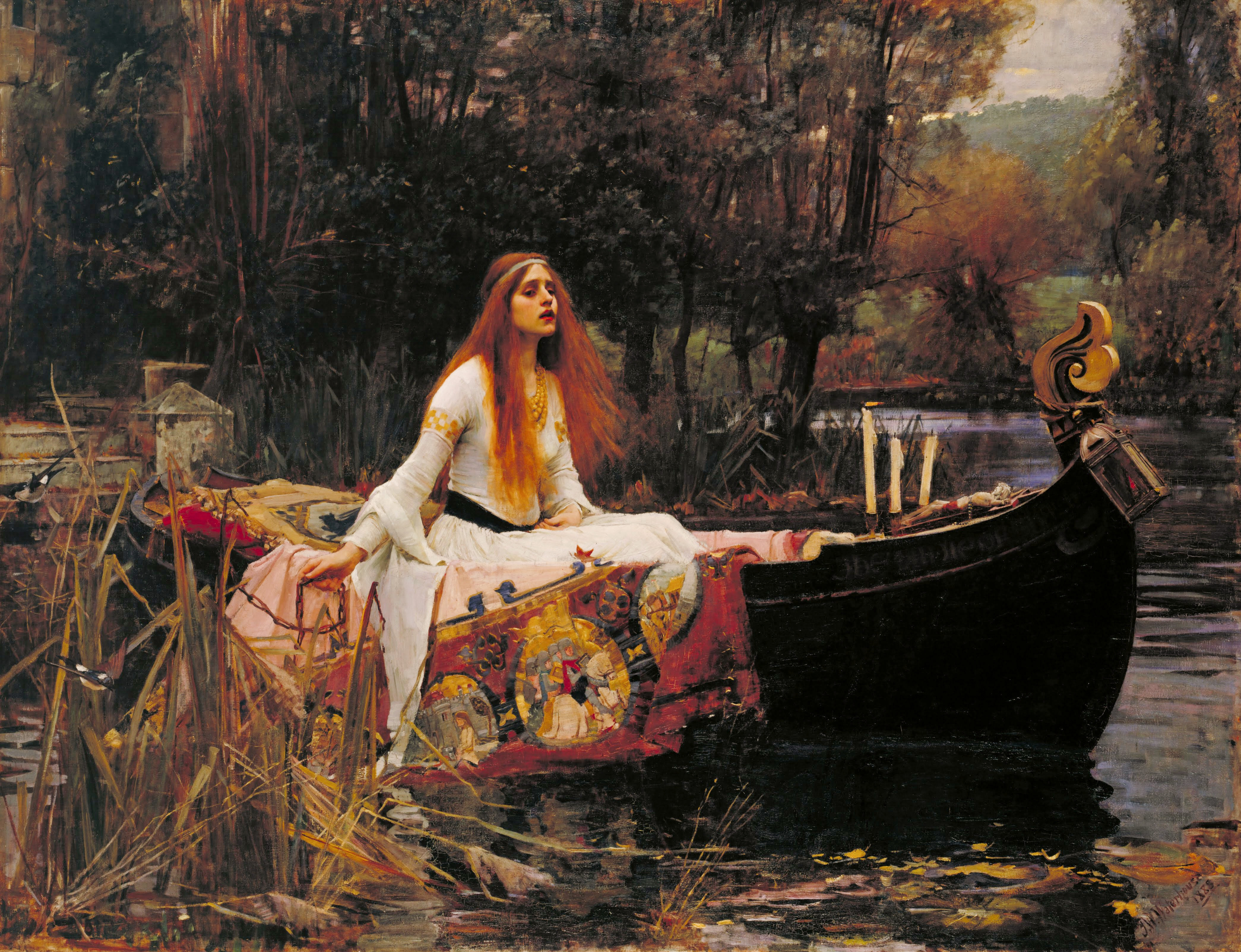
- Artist: John William Waterhouse
- Year: 1888
- Medium: Oil on canvas
- Dimensions: 183 cm × 230 cm (72 in × 91 in)
- Location: Tate Britain, London

The Lady of Shalott is a painting of 1888 by the English painter John William Waterhouse. It is a representation of the ending of Alfred, Lord Tennyson's 1832 poem of the same name. Waterhouse painted three versions of this character, in 1888, 1894 and 1915. It is one of his most famous works, which adopted much of the style of the Pre-Raphaelite Brotherhood, though Waterhouse was painting several decades after the Brotherhood split up during his early childhood.

The Lady of Shalott was donated to the public by Sir Henry Tate in 1894 and is usually on display in Tate Britain, London, in room 1840.

== Description ==
The Lady of Shalott, an 1888 oil-on-canvas painting, is one of John William Waterhouse's most famous works. It depicts a scene from Tennyson's poem in which the poet describes the plight and the predicament of a young woman, loosely based on the figure of Elaine of Astolat from medieval Arthurian legend, who yearned with an unrequited love for the knight Sir Lancelot, isolated under an undisclosed curse in a tower near King Arthur's Camelot. Waterhouse painted three versions of this character, in 1888, 1894 and 1915.

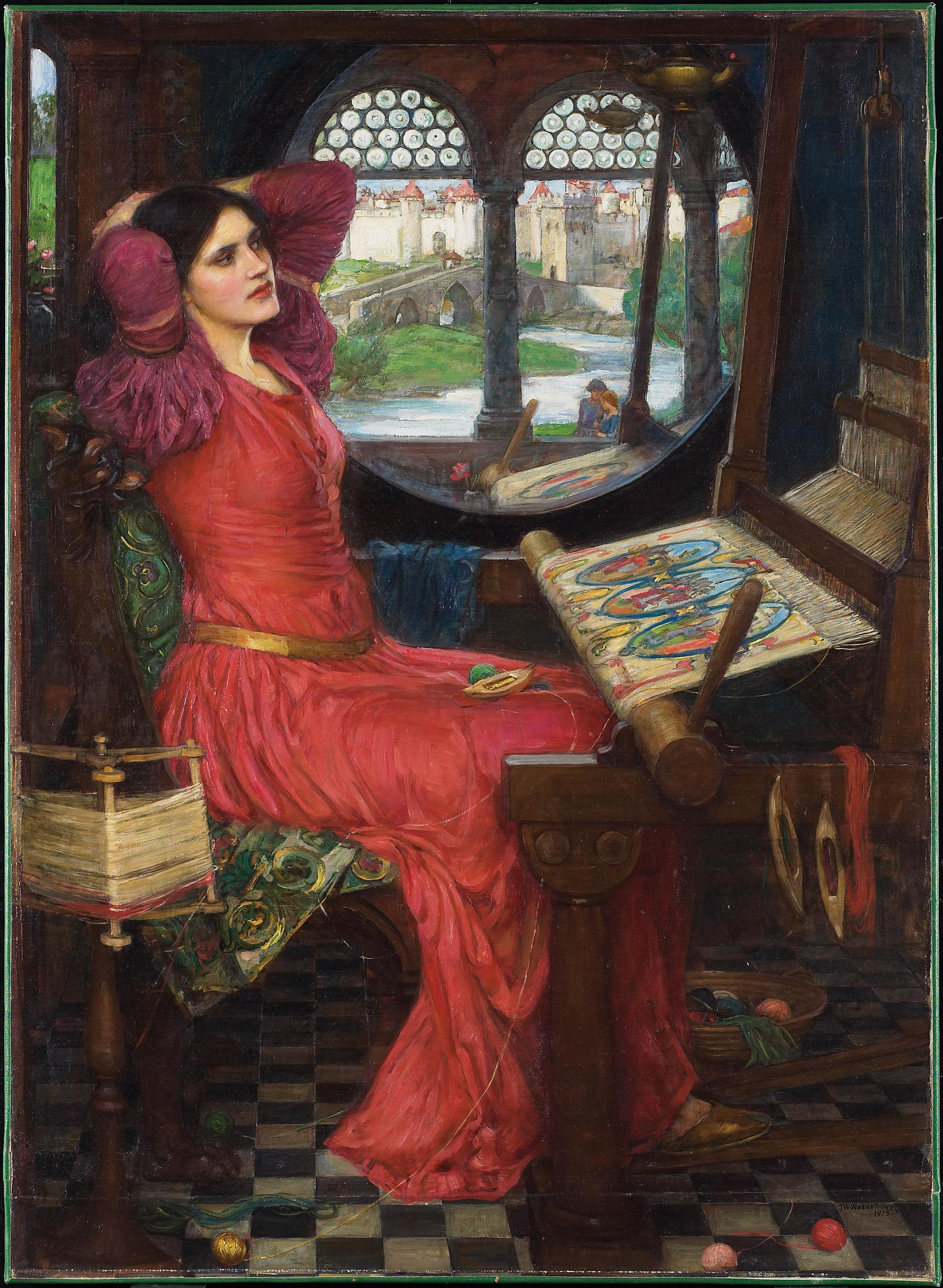
I am Half-Sick of Shadows, said the Lady of Shalott, 1915
Art Gallery of Ontario, Toronto

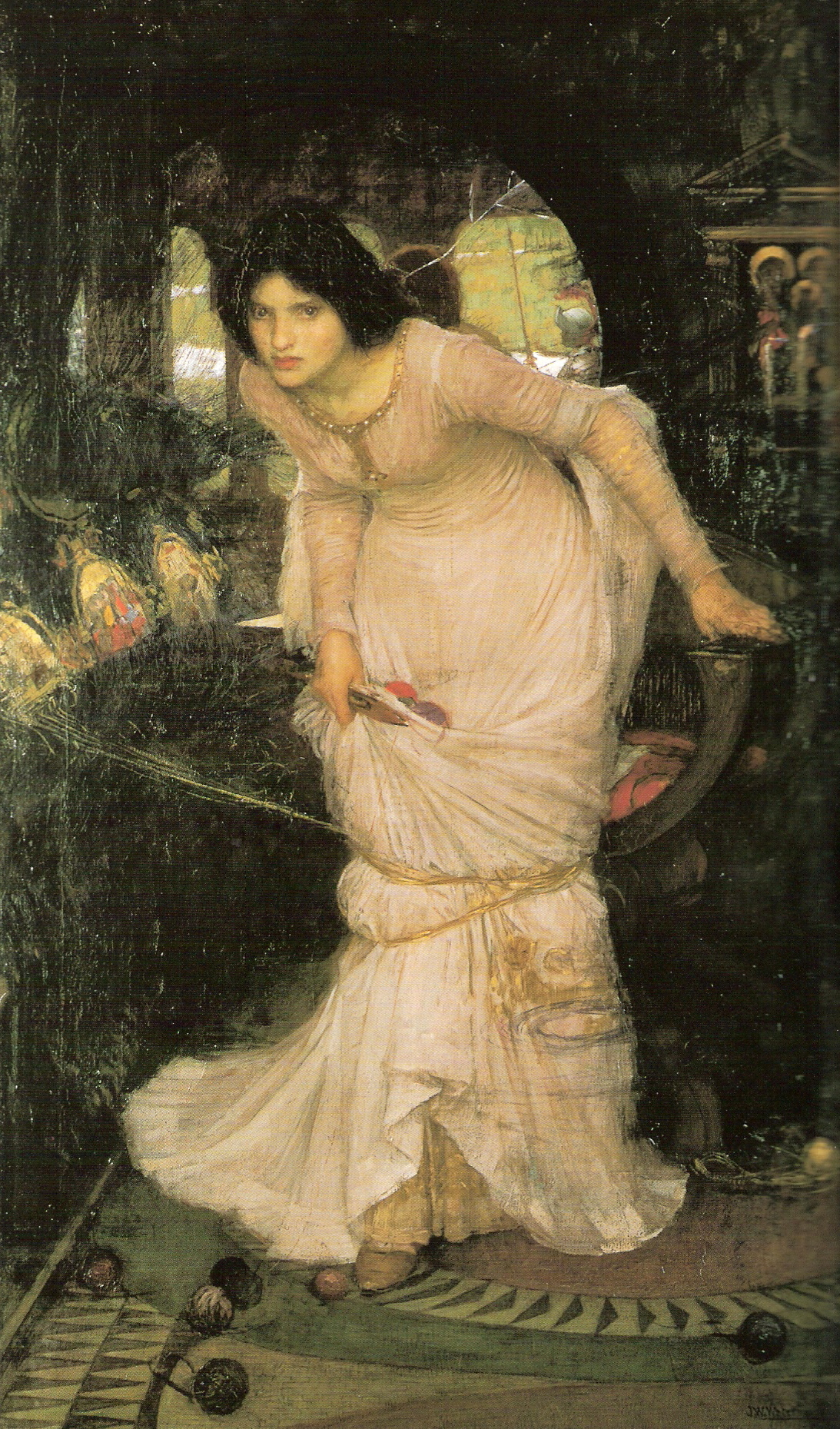
The Lady of Shalott Looking at Lancelot, 1894
Leeds City Art Gallery

The painting contains a range of bright colours typical of the Pre-Raphaelites. It pictures the titular character of Tennyson's poem, also titled The Lady of Shalott (1842). In the poem, the Lady had been confined to her quarters under a curse that forbade her to go outside or even look directly out of a window; her only view of the world was through a mirror. She sat below the mirror and wove a tapestry of scenes she could see by the reflection. After defying the curse by looking out the window at Camelot, she made her way to a small boat. This is the moment pictured in Waterhouse's painting as she leaves to face her destiny and she is shown sitting on the tapestry she has woven.

The Lady has a lantern at the front of her boat, and a crucifix is positioned near the bow. Next to the crucifix are three candles. Candles were a representation of life – two of the candles are already blown out, signifying that her death is soon to come. Aside from the metaphoric details, this painting is valued for Waterhouse's realistic painting abilities. The Lady's dress is stark white against the much darker hues of the background. Waterhouse's close attention to detail and colour, the accentuation of the beauty of nature, realist quality, and his interpretation of her vulnerable, wistful face are further demonstrations of his artistic skill. Naturalistic details include two swallows and the water plants that would be found in a river in England at this time.

== Tennyson's poem ==
According to Tennyson's version of the legend, the Lady of Shalott was forbidden to look directly at reality or the outside world; instead, she was doomed to view the world through a mirror and weave what she saw into tapestry. Her despair was heightened when she saw loving couples entwined in the far distance, and she spent her days and nights aching for a return to normal. One day the Lady's mirror revealed Sir Lancelot passing by on his horse. When she impetuously took three paces across the room and looked at him, the mirror cracked, and she realised that the curse had befallen her. The lady escaped by boat during an autumn storm, inscribing 'The Lady of Shalott' on the prow. As she sailed towards Camelot and certain death, she sang a lament. Her frozen body was found shortly afterwards by the knights and ladies of Camelot, one of whom is Lancelot, who prayed to God to have mercy on her soul.

From part IV of Tennyson's poem:

And down the river's dim expanse
Like some bold seer in a trance,
Seeing all his own mischance
With glassy countenance
Did she look to Camelot.
And at the closing of the day
She loosed the chain, and down she lay;
The broad stream bore her far away,
The Lady of Shalott.

Tennyson also reworked the story in Elaine, part of his Arthurian epic Idylls of the King, published in 1859, though in this version the Lady is rowed by a retainer in her final voyage.

== Other versions ==
Tennyson's verse was popular with many of the Pre-Raphaelite poets and painters and was illustrated by such artists as Dante Gabriel Rossetti, William Maw Egley, and William Holman Hunt. Throughout his career, Waterhouse was preoccupied with the poetry of both Tennyson and John Keats. Between 1886 and 1915 Waterhouse painted three episodes from the poem, as well as La Belle Dame sans Merci (1893) from the poem by John Keats.

== See also ==
- List of paintings by John William Waterhouse
- The Lady of Shalott (1905), a painting by William Holman Hunt

== Sources ==
- Casteras, Susan. The Victorians: British Painting, 1837–1901. Washington, D.C.: National Gallery of Art, 1997.
- Poulson, Christine, The Quest for the Grail: Arthurian Legend in British Art, 1840–1920, 1999, Manchester University Press, ISBN 0719055377, 9780719055379, google books
