= The Lady of Shalott (William Holman Hunt) =

Painting by William Holman Hunt

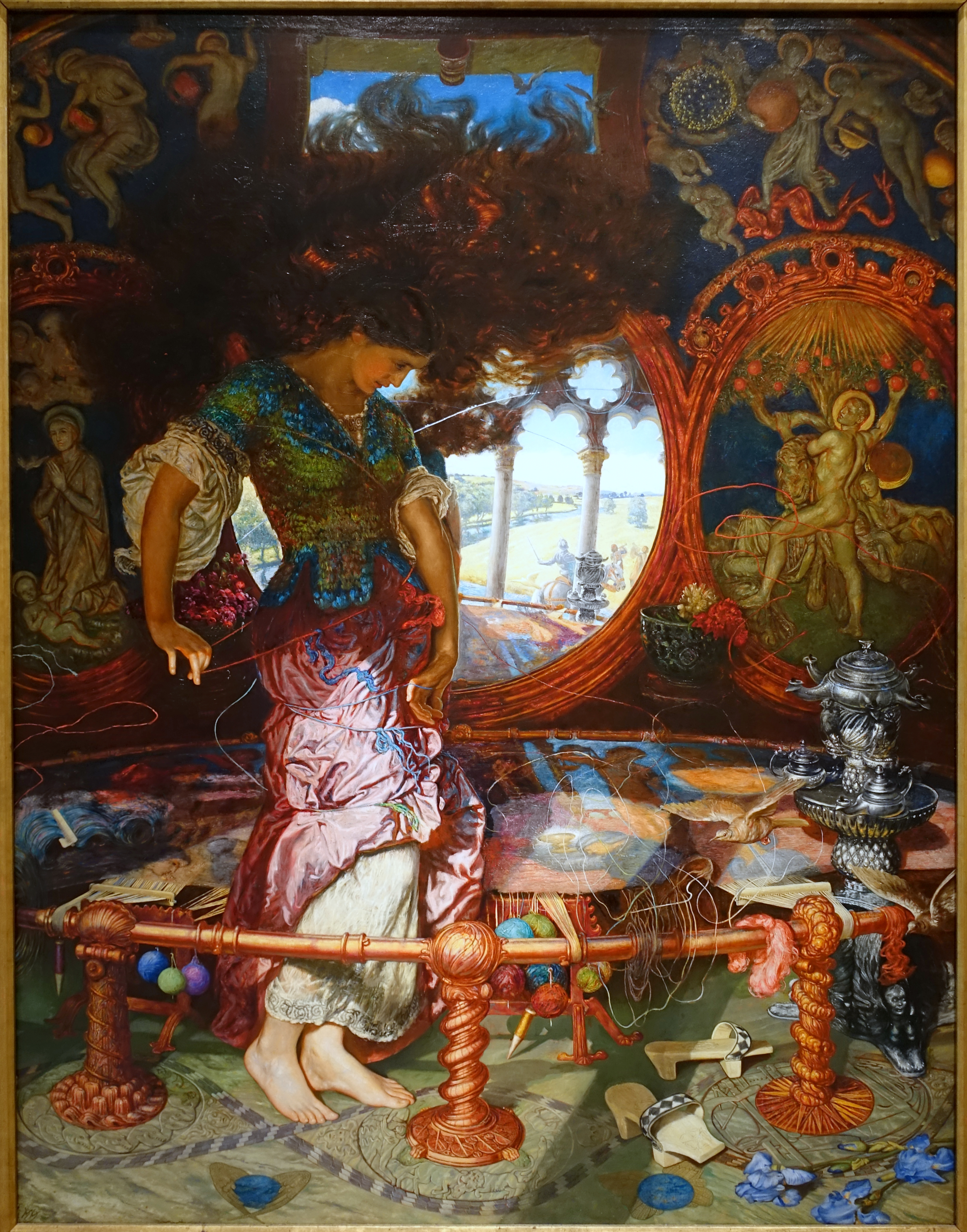
- Artist: William Holman Hunt
- Year: c. 1888–1905
- Medium: oil on canvas
- Dimensions: 188.3 cm × 146.4 cm (74.1 in × 57.6 in)
- Location: Wadsworth Atheneum, Hartford, Connecticut

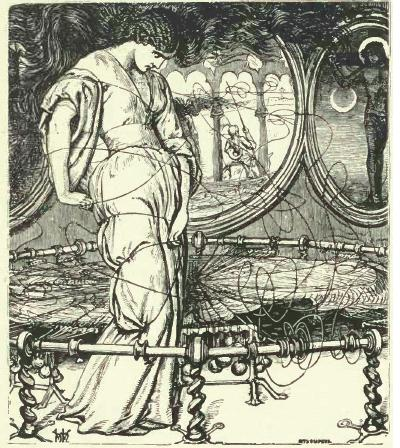
Wood engraving by John Thompson, published in 1857, based on Hunt's drawing, 95 × 79 mm

The Lady of Shalott is an oil painting by the English artist William Holman Hunt, made c. 1888–1905, and depicting a scene from Tennyson's 1832 poem, "The Lady of Shalott". The painting is held by the Wadsworth Atheneum, in Hartford, Connecticut. A smaller version is held by the Manchester Art Gallery.

== Background ==
In Tennyson's poem, the Lady of Shalott is confined to a tower on an island near Camelot, cursed not to leave the tower or look out of its windows. She weaves a tapestry, viewing the outside world only through reflections in a mirror behind her. The painting depicts the pivotal scene in the third part of the poem: the Lady spies "bold Sir Launcelot" in her mirror. The sight of the handsome knight and the sound of him singing draws her away from her loom to the window, yarn still clinging around her knees, bringing down the curse upon her as "the mirror crack'd from side to side". She leaves the tower to take a boat across the river, but meets her death before she reaches Camelot.

== Description ==
The painting depicts the moment immediately after the Lady of Shalott has looked directly out of her window at Sir Launcelot, as her fate begins to unwind. She is standing within her circular loom, with an unfinished and indistinct tapestry intended to represent Galahad presenting the Holy Grail to Arthur, However, the weaving is breaking, trapping her in its threads. She is wearing a brightly coloured bodice over a cream chemise, with a pink skirt. Her feet are bare, with her slip-on pattens nearby, and her long hair has whipped up wildly above her head.

Disturbed from their perch, a pair of doves are flying past a large silver candlestick, while another pair escape through an upper window. Behind her is the large round mirror that she had used to observe the world outside her tower, but it has "crack'd from side to side": the reflection shows Launcelot riding past, and the pillars of the Lady's window. The irises littering the floor indicate that her purity is stained.

To her left is an oval roundel of the adoration of the Christ Child by Mary (representing humility), based on a work by Lucca della Robbia that Hunt owned. The roundel on her right shows a haloed Hercules (representing valour) during his labour to take apples from the garden of the Hesperides, who slept while their guardian serpent (under Hercules's left foot) was defeated. As a study for this detail, Hunt made an actual plaster bas-relief, now in the Manchester Art Gallery. The Hesperides' failure in their duty mirrors the lady’s.

Above the roundels is a frieze of a stylised sky, containing cherubs and haloed female figures guiding planets and a sphere of stars. One of the angelic beings stomps on a serpent. The frieze symbolizes harmony and patience, values that Hunt believed the lady should have possessed.

The work measures 188.3 cm × 146.4 cm (74.1 in × 57.6 in) is signed with a monogram to the lower left.

== History ==
The painting is based on Hunt's c. 1857 drawing, which was engraved on wood by John Thompson and printed in the lavishly illustrated 10th edition of Tennyson's Poems, published by Edward Moxon in 1857, which also included illustrations by Dante Gabriel Rossetti, John Millais, Thomas Creswick, John Callcott Horsley, William Mulready and Clarkson Stanfield. Hunt's drawing and painting were based on earlier sketches, inspired by Jan van Eyck's 1434 marriage portrait, The Arnolfini Portrait.

William Holman Hunt gave the painting to his second wife Edith in 1902. It was put up for auction at Christie’s in 1919, but bought in by the auction house for £3,360. On Edith's death, the painting was inherited by their daughter Gladys in 1931, and then by her adopted daughter Mrs. Elisabeth Burt in 1952. It was sold at Christie's in 1961, bought by New York collector John Nicholson for £9,975; he sold it to the Wadsworth Atheneum the same year in 1961, who made the purchase using money from the Ella Gallup Sumner and Mary Catlin Sumner Collection Fund; they were the wives of the brothers George Gleason Sumner and Francis Chester Sumner.

== Another version ==
A much smaller oil-on-panel version, c. 1886–1905, 44.4 cm × 34.1 cm (17.5 in × 13.4 in), was left to the Manchester Art Gallery by John Edward Yates in 1934. This version was a preparatory study for the larger picture, and it features a number of differences. Notably, the roundels show instead the Agony in the Garden (left) and Christ in Majesty (right). The frieze consists of a row of standing cherubs.

== Sources ==
- The Lady of Shalott, Wadsworth Atheneum
- The Lady of Shalott, William Holman Hunt (1827–1910), Manchester Art Gallery, ArtUK
- William Holman Hunt, The Lady of Shalott, engraved by J. Thompson, published 1857, Tate Gallery
- The Lady of Shalott, 1857, After William Holman Hunt (1827 - 1910), Royal Academy
- "‘The Breaking of the Web’: William Holman Hunt’s two early versions of The Lady of Shalott", Art Journal 32, Alison Inglis & Cecilia O'Brien, 18 June 2014, National Gallery of Victoria
- "Hunt: The Lady of Shalott", Encyclopaedia Romana
- "In Focus: How Holman Hunt’s Lady of Shallot was inspired by Van Eyck’s greatest masterpiece", Lilias Wigan, Country Life, 2 March 2018
- The Moxon illustrated edition of Tennyson's Poems, British Library
