= Trodd =

Trodd is an English surname. Notable people with this surname include:

- John Trodd (1828–1858), English cricket player
- Kenith Trodd (born 1936), British television producer
- Thomas Trodd (1842–1908), English cricket player
- William Trodd (1836–1880), English cricket player
