= GuilFest =

Annual music festival in Guildford, England

Coordinates: 51°14′42″N 0°33′59″W

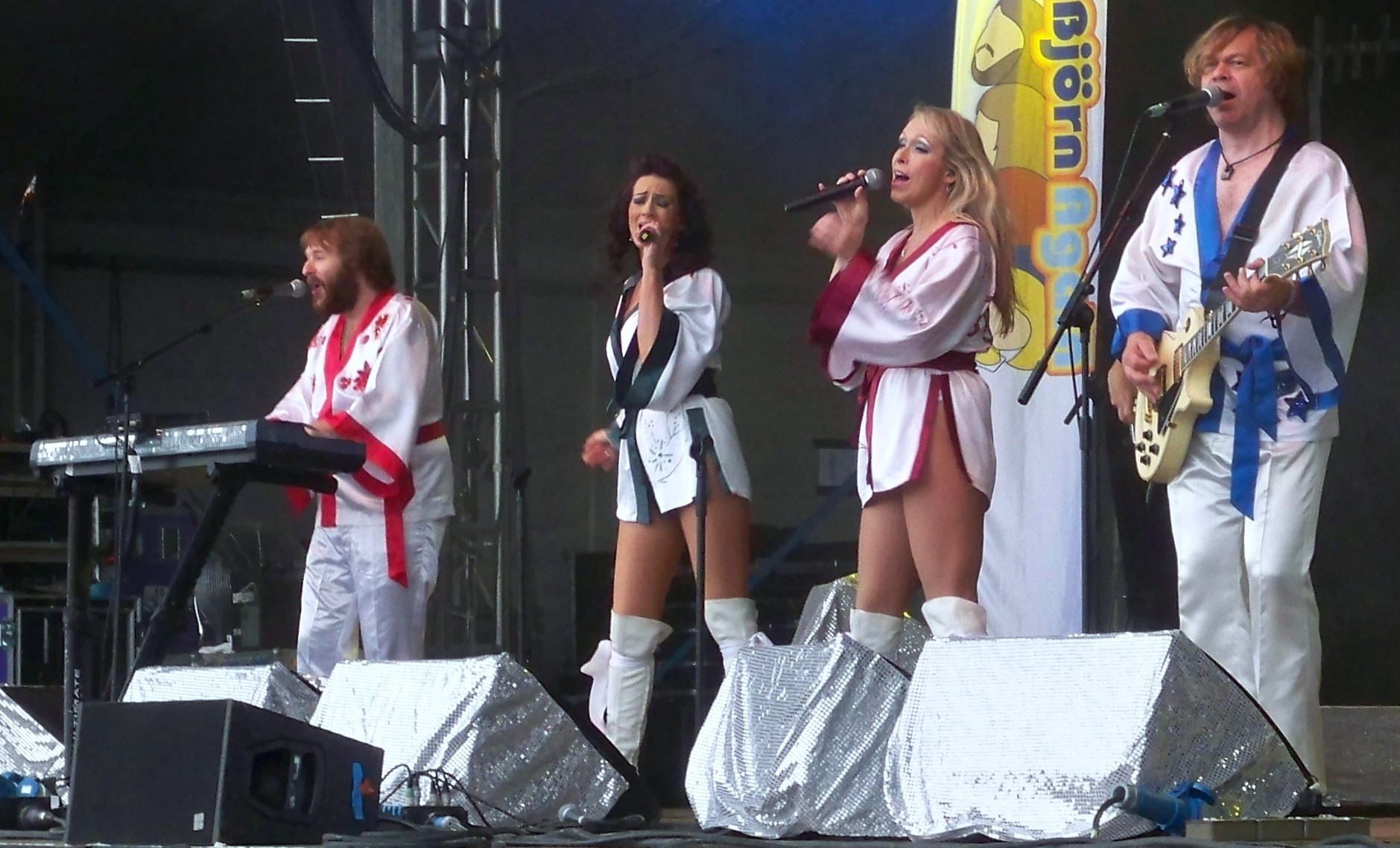
- Björn Again at GuilFest 2012
- Genre: Rock, alternative rock, indie rock, dance, world music, punk rock, reggae, folk
- Locations: Guildford, England
- Years active: 1992–2014, 2022–present
- Founders: Tony Scott
- Website: guilfest.co.uk

GuilFest, formerly the Guildford Festival of Folk and Blues, is an annual music festival held in Stoke Park, Guildford, England. The festival, like the larger Glastonbury Festival, features a range of genres including rock, folk, blues, and in recent years pop. In 2006 GuilFest was awarded the title of "Best Family Festival" in the UK Festival awards. Following a 10-year hiatus from 2014, GuilFest returned to Stoke Park in summer 2024.

== GuilFests 1992–2014 ==
The event was started in 1992 by Tony Scott a Guildford businessman who is a keen festival-goer, the festival grew from an audience size of 500 with two stages in 1992 to 20,000 with 10 stages by 2011. As well as music, the festival also included comedy, theatre and performing arts. From 1992 to 1994 it was a one-day event. In 1995 it became a two-day event with onsite camping and was moved to nearby Loseley Park. GuilFest returned to Stoke Park in 1996 and became a three-day festival in 1997 with headliners Jethro Tull.

1992 Guildford Festival of Folk and Blues, a one day event with two stages headlined by Peter Sarstedt, John Otway, Macavity's Cat.

1993 with headliner Wilko Johnson Band.

1994 three stages with acts including Tom Robinson Band, John Otway Big Band.

1995 becomes a 2 day event with 3 stages and moves to Loseley Park with acts including Richard Thompson (musician), Peter Sarstedt, Chumbawamba, The Hamsters, Oysterband.

1996 the event moves back to Stoke Park, with acts including Peter Green (musician), Eddi Reader, The Hamsters, Shane MacGowan & The Popes.

1997 becomes a three day event with acts including Levellers (band), The Saw Doctors, Jethro Tull (band), Carter the Unstoppable Sex Machine, Dreadzone.

1998 acts included Space, Shed Seven and The Lightning Seeds, The Levellers.

1999 acts included James, Jools Holland & His Rhythm and Blues Orchestra, The Saw Doctors.

2000 was Van Morrison, Motörhead, David Gray, Culture Club, Rolf Harris and Joan Armatrading.

2001 included Pulp, James, Reef, Dreadzone, Lonnie Donegan and Dead Men Walking.

2002 acts included Fun Lovin' Criminals, The Pretenders and Jools Holland.

In 2003, the main acts were Madness, Alice Cooper, The Darkness and Atomic Kitten.

In 2004 the main acts were Katie Melua, Simple Minds, Blondie and UB40.

The 2005 event, at that point the biggest in the event's history with 15,000 people attending, featured 6 music stages along with a comedy tent. The headline acts were The Pogues, Paul Weller and Status Quo, other acts included Chas and Dave, The Subways and The Storys.

The 2006 event was headlined by Embrace, a-ha and Billy Idol, and featured Nizlopi, The Wonder Stuff, The Lightning Seeds, The Stranglers, Gary Numan and The Storys. GuilFest won the Best Family Festival Award for 2006.

The 2007 event was held again at Stoke Park on the 13th, 14th, and 15 July 2007 and the BBC Radio 2 main stage was headlined by Supergrass, Squeeze and Madness. The Magic Numbers played before Madness on the Sunday. The second stage (sponsored by Ents24) featured Richard Thompson, The Saw Doctors, and Uriah Heep as the headliners.

The 2008 event was sponsored by the University of Surrey and headlined by The Levellers, Blondie and The Australian Pink Floyd Show. Fightstar, The Ghost of a Thousand, The Blackout and Midasuno played the Rock Sound sponsored Rock Cave in 2008 as well.

2009 performers included: Motörhead, Goldie Lookin Chain, You Me at Six, Brian Wilson (Beach Boys), The Charlatans, Athlete, Toploader, Will Young, Happy Mondays, Nouvelle Vague, Joe Bonamassa, The Wailers, Eureka Machines, DJ Yoda, Rusko, The Love Band, The Fins and Andrew Morris (Singer Songwriter).

2010's line-up included Status Quo, N-Dubz, Tinie Tempah, Chase & Status, Hawkwind, Just Jack, The Human League, 10cc, The Blockheads, Orbital, The Blackout, Rock Choir and Hadouken!,

2011's line-up included Razorlight, James Blunt, Adam Ant, Erasure, Ziggy Marley, Peter Andre, The Farm, Roger Daltrey.

2012's line-up included Olly Murs, Bryan Ferry, Gary Numan, Ash, Alvin Startdust, Slider.

2014's line-up included The Boomtown Rats, Kool & The Gang, The Human League, Fun Lovin' Criminals, Boney M., Katrina Leskanich Ms Dynamite, The Blackout.

== GuilFest 2022 ==
Held at Hurtwood Polo Club, in Cranleigh

2022 line-up included Sister Sledge, Björn Again, Peter Hook and the Light, Dodgy, Baccara, Republica.

== GuilFest 2024 ==
Held at Stoke Park

2024 line-up included Sam Ryder, The Stranglers, Peter Hook and the Light, The Blockheads, Bez (musician), Urban Cookie Collective, Kiki Dee, Nouvelle Vague (band), The Skints, Dutty Moonshine Big Band, From the Jam, Black Grape, Mr.B The Gentleman Rhymer, Alex Party, The Vapors, The Bootleg Beatles, Elvana.

== Insolvency ==
After 21 years, GuilFest shut down. Scotty Events Ltd, the company that ran the festival, said matters were in the hands of an insolvency practitioner. Tony Scott, from Scotty Events, said the company had been left with debts of about £300,000. He said the company's debts included payments to cover tax, VAT, PAYE, Surrey Police, Guildford Borough Council and private individuals.

Reasons cited by organisers included the abundance of competing major events in that year, most notably the London Olympics. Poor weather also contributed with the rain turning Stoke Park into a "quagmire by Saturday – and by Sunday it had turned into sticky bog".

To fill the gap, for 2013 the Magic FM Summer Of Love event was held at Stoke Park on the weekend of 13–14 July 2013, headlined by Jamiroquai and Bryan Adams. A rival event, free festival GU1, took place the same weekend at the Holroyd Arms, a Guildford pub, in protest at what organisers saw as the "corporate takeover" of the former Guilfest by Magic FM's promoters Live Nation. The line-up included The Feathers, Louise Distras, Shakespearos, Anarchistwood, The Unbelievable Freeloaders From Mars, P45, Unexpected Item In The Bagging Area, Archive 45, Gobsausage, Black Anchor, Collage of Sound, Snork and Kerb.

GuilFest returned in 2014 after permission was given quite late for an event this size in January of the same year, with conditions imposed by the local council. Unfortunately despite reports of it being one of the best festivals the organisers had run, it went into insolvency again shortly afterwards blaming a bad weather forecast, leading to low ticket sales.

== Revival ==
Eight years passed before GuilFest returned again, still being run by Tony Scott, on 16–17 July 2022 at a new location, Hurtwood Polo Club, in Cranleigh. This was headlined by Peter Hook and Sister Sledge.

Although a much smaller event, 2022 enabled the festival to gear up for its return to Stoke Park in 2024, and a surprise announcement was made in December 2023 with the line-up.
