= Stoke next Guildford =

Coordinates: 51.247015°N 0.571001°W

- Parish
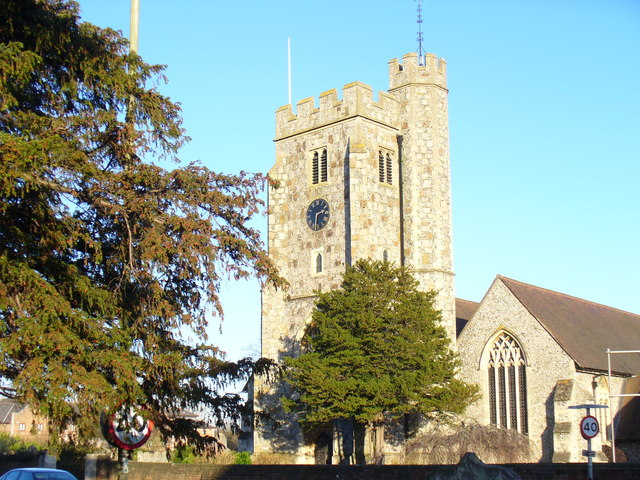
- St John the Evangelist's parish church, Stoke-next-Guildford, Surrey, seen from the southwest

- Location within Surrey
- OS grid reference: SU9949
- District: Guildford
- Shire county: Surrey
- Region: South East
- Country: England
- Sovereign state: United Kingdom
- Post town: GUILDFORD
- Postcode district: GU1-4
- Dialling code: 01483
- Police: Surrey
- Fire: Surrey
- Ambulance: South East Coast
- UK Parliament: Guildford

Stoke next Guildford, or Stoke juxta Guildford, is a former civil parish in the town of Guildford, Surrey, England. In 1901 the parish had a population of 4462.

== Location ==
The parish of Stoke next Guildford lies across the River Wey just below Guildford. It was known as Stochae in the 11th century and as Stok in the 13th century. It is bounded on the west and north by Worplesdon, on the east by Merrow, on the south by St. Martha's, Shalford, and the Guildford parishes. The terrain includes the chalk ridge east of Guildford, the Thanet and Woolwich beds, the London Clay, and the sand and alluvium of the Wey Valley.

== History ==
Neolithic implements have been found in the parish.

According to John Marius Wilson's Imperial Gazetteer of England and Wales (1870–72), the manor of Stoke-next-Guildford belonged to the Crown from the time of King Edward the Confessor (d. 1066) until that of King John (1166–1216), when it was given to the Diocese of London. It reverted to the Crown in the first year of the reign of Queen Elizabeth I of England (r. 1558–1603). The manor was passed to various proprietors, and in 1870 belonged to the Onslows.

The living was a rectory in the Diocese of Winchester. In 1851 the population was 2,507, and this had increased to 3,797 by 1861. In 1870, the parish covered 2,314 acres (936 ha). The Cobham and Guildford railway line was opened in 1885 with a station in the parish on the London road. In 1894 the southern, urban, part of the parish was split off as the parish of Stoke Within, reducing the suburban and rural Stoke next Guildford parish to 2,049 acres. The parish today is in the Diocese of Guildford.

The civil parish was formed in 1894 from the rural part of Stoke, on 15 November 1904 the parish was abolished and merged with Stoke and Worplesdon.

== Church ==
The parish church is St John the Evangelist Church, Stoke Road, Guildford. The church has a squat and battlemented 15th-century tower, but the rest is mainly Victorian, with plain walls, windows and roofs. The interior has a broad nave and aisles with an exposed beam roof. Low pillars, some of which are very old, support arches that separate the aisles from the nave. Stone wall panels include works by the sculptors John Flaxman, John Bacon Junior and Edward Hodges Baily. The church is surrounded by a large churchyard.

== Buildings ==
The parish contains Stoke Park and the historic manor of Stoke at its centre, now the site of Guildford College. It also contains the Guildford Spectrum leisure and sports centre.

On Stoke Road, there is a listed hotel, The Stoke.

== Notable people ==
- The pipe maker Eduard Bird bought his burghership in Amsterdam in 1638, recording his birthplace as Stoock in Surrey. This seems to refer to Stokes-next-to-Guildfort.
- Catherine Ann Dorset (1752–1834), a British author of poems for children, was born in Stoke next Guildford in 1752 and baptized on 17 January 1753.
- Thomas Moore (1821–87), a British gardener and botanist, was born at Stoke.
- John Trodd (1828–1858), an English first-class cricketer, was born at Stoke next Guildford in July 1828.
- George Griffith (1833–79), an English first-class cricketer, died at Stoke.
- Graham Ingham (1851–1926), an eminent Anglican bishop and author, was Rector of Stoke-next-Guildford from 1897 to 1904.

== Sources ==
- De Roever, Margriet (1 January 1987), "The Fort Orange "EB" Pipe Bowls", New World Dutch Studies: Dutch Arts and Culture in Colonial America, 1609-1776 : Proceedings of the Symposium, SUNY Press / Albany Institute of History and Art, ISBN 978-0-939072-10-1
- Malden, H.E., ed. (1911). "Parishes: Stoke juxta Guildford". A History of the County of Surrey. Vol. 3. London: Archibald Constable – via British History Online.
- Wilson, John Marius (1870). The imperial gazetteer of England and Wales : embracing recent changes in counties, dioceses, parishes, and boroughs: general statistics: postal arrangements: railway systems, &c.; and forming a complete description of the country. Vol. VI.
