= William Mulready =

Irish genre painter (1786–1863)

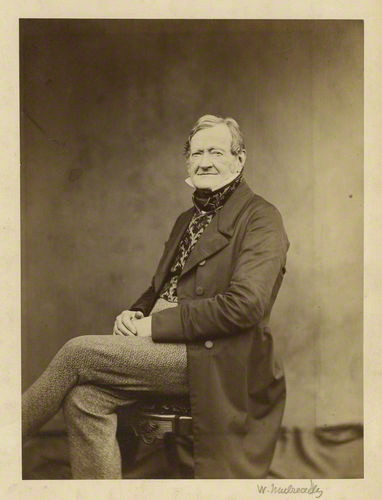
- 1860s albumen print portrait by Cundall, Downes & Co
- Born: 1 April 1786; Ennis, County Clare, Ireland
- Died: 7 July 1863 (aged 77); Bayswater, London, England

William Mulready RA (1 April 1786 – 7 July 1863) was an Irish genre painter living in London. He is best known for his romanticising depictions of rural scenes, and for creating Mulready stationery letter sheets, issued at the same time as the Penny Black postage stamp.

== Life and family ==
William Mulready was born in Ennis, County Clare. Early in his life, in 1792, the family moved to London, where he was able to get an education and was taught painting well enough so that he was accepted at the Royal Academy School at the age of fourteen.

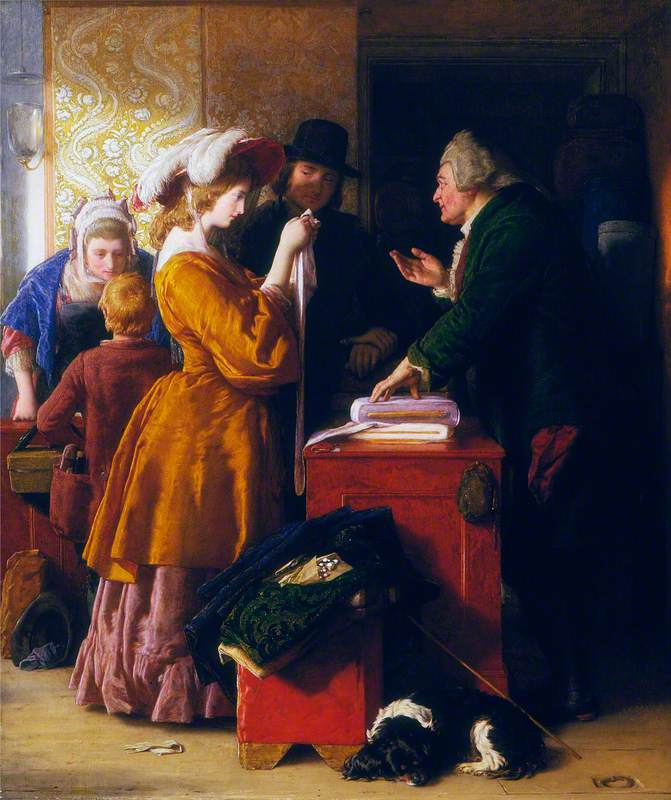
Choosing the Wedding Gown, 1845 illustrating chapter 1 of Vicar of Wakefield by Oliver Goldsmith

In 1802, he married Elizabeth Varley (1784–1864), a landscape painter. She came from a family of established artists; her brothers included John Varley, friend of William Blake, Cornelius Varley, and William Fleetwood Varley.

Their three children, Paul Augustus (1805–1864), William (1805–1878), and Michael (1807–1889) also became artists. His relationship with his wife however deteriorated gradually over the years, which is detailed in papers stored at the library of the Victoria and Albert Museum. His strong Catholic beliefs prevented any chance of a divorce but they separated. He accused her of "bad conduct" but shied from providing details. In a letter to him in 1827 she blamed him entirely for the collapse of their marriage, suggesting cruelty, pederastic activities and adultery were the reasons, writing that one of his pupils, Harriet Gouldsmith, had told her Malready "preferred her little finger" to his wife and children, and accusing him having "had taken a low boy to your bed, and turned one adrift at midnight, to seek one at the house of an unmarried man".

His son, William Mulready Junior (1805–1878), lived in London and maintained a career of a portrait painter and picture restorer. He had five children (Ellen, Mary, Augustus Edwin, Henry William, and John). They also were trained as artists, but not all of them pursued the artistic career: Henry William and John described themselves as 'house painters'. Augustus Edwin Mulready (1844–1904) was the most successful of them and became known as a member of the Cranbrook Colony of artists.

== Artistic career ==
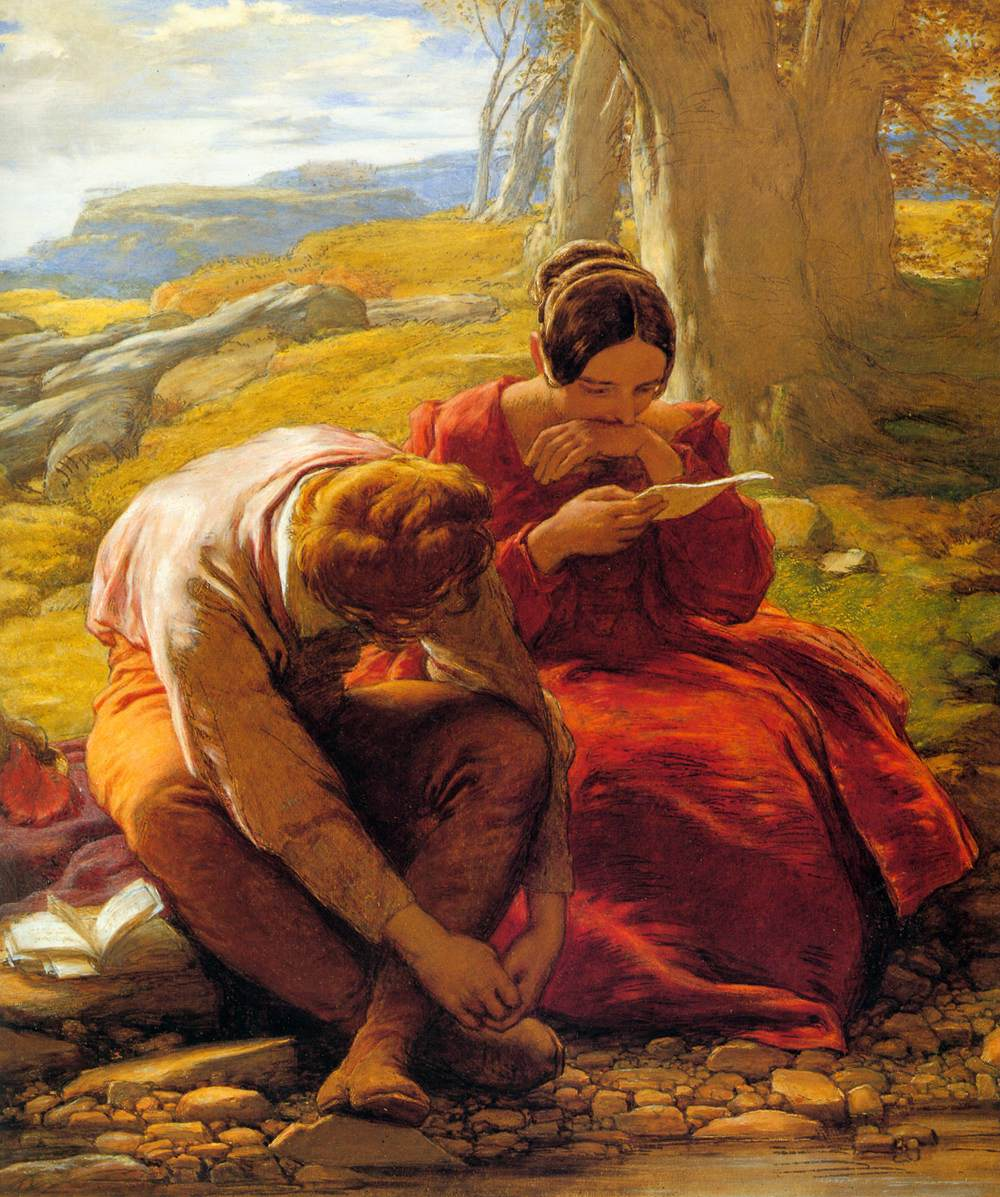
The Sonnet: 1839 Mulready oil painting in V&A Collection

Many of his early pictures show landscapes, before he started to build a reputation as a genre painter from 1808 on, painting mostly everyday scenes from rural life. He also illustrated children's books including the first edition of Charles and Mary Lamb's Tales from Shakespeare in 1807; William Roscoe's entertaining poem The Butterfly's Ball, and the Grasshopper's Feast in the same year; and a sequel to the latter by Catherine Ann Dorset. Some of these were for the Juvenile Library of William Godwin and Mary Jane Clairmont; Godwin in turn wrote, under a pseudonym, an account of Mulready's early life, suitable for children.

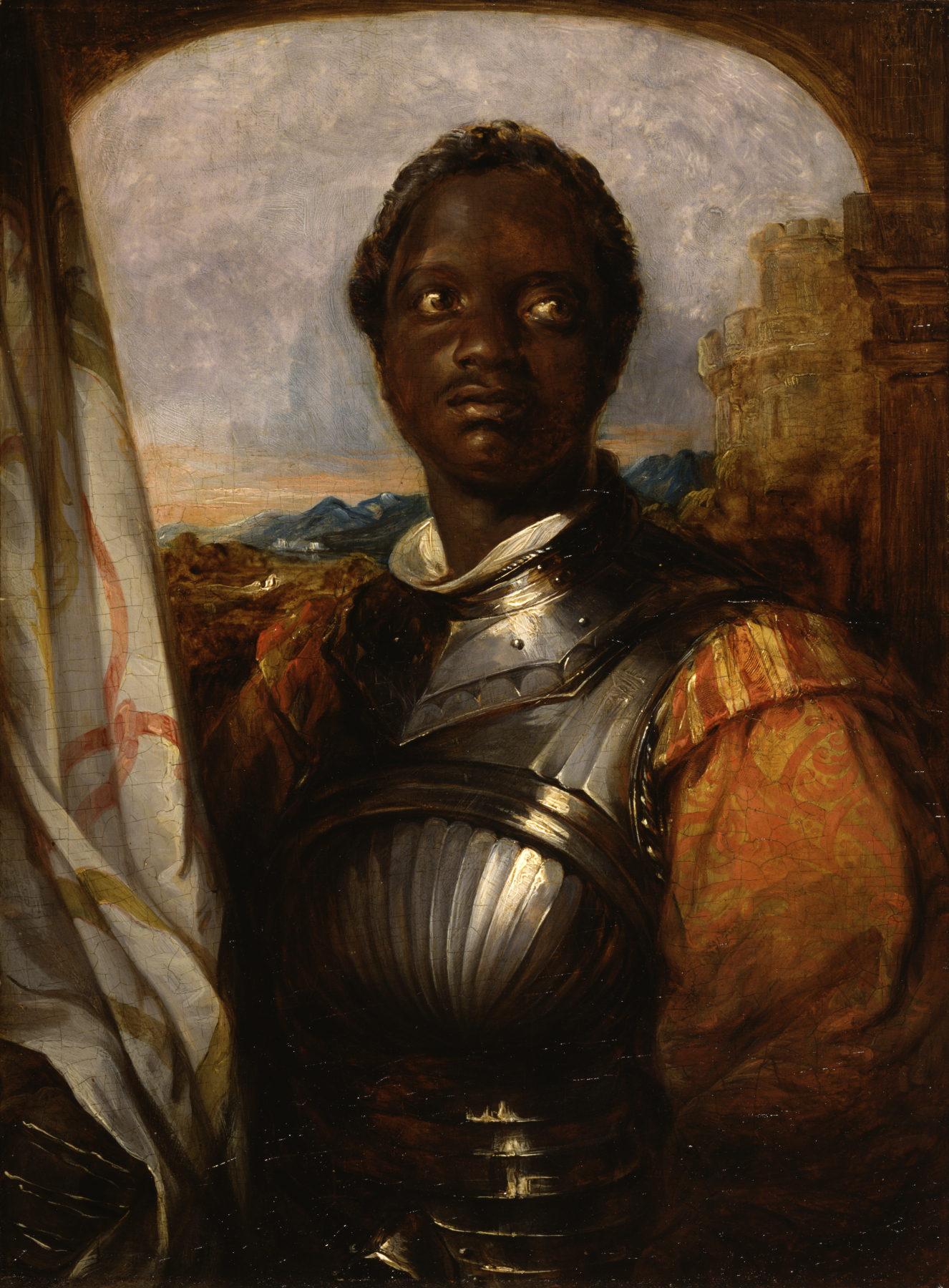
This painting by Mulready portrays the African-American actor Ira Aldridge, known in Europe for his Shakespearean roles, including Othello, Lear, and Macbeth. The Walters Art Museum.

Mulready's paintings were popular in Victorian times. His first painting of importance, Returning from the Ale House, now in the Tate Gallery, London, under the title Fair Time, appeared in 1809.

In 1815 he became an Associate of the Royal Academy (A.R.A.) and R.A. in 1816. He displayed The Fight Interrupted at the Royal Academy Exhibition of 1816. In the same year, he also was awarded the French "Legion of Honour". Mulready's most important pictures are in the Victoria and Albert Museum and in the Tate Gallery. In the former are 33, among them Hampstead Heath (1806); Giving a Bite (1836); First Love (1839); The Sonnet (1839); Choosing the Wedding Gown (1846); and The Butt (Shooting a Cherry) (1848). In the latter are five, including a Snow Scene. In the National Gallery, Dublin, are Young Brother and The Toy Seller. His Wolf and the Lamb is in Royal possession.

In 1840, Mulready designed the illustrations for the postal stationery, known as Mulready stationery were introduced by the Royal Mail at the same time as the Penny Black in May 1840. They were issued in two forms; one variant was precut to a diamond or lozenge shape and folded to form an envelope that could be held together by seal at the apex of the topmost flap; and lettersheets that were cut in rectangles, folded over and sealed or tucked in. Stationery manufacturers, whose livelihood was threatened by the new lettersheet, produced many caricatures (or lampoons) of Mulready's design. Only six days after their introduction, on 12 May, Rowland Hill wrote that; I fear we shall have to substitute some other stamp for that design by Mulready ... the public have shown their disregard and even distaste for beauty, and within two months a decision had been made to replace the Mulready designed stationery. Essentially Mulready's designs were a folly.

== Death ==
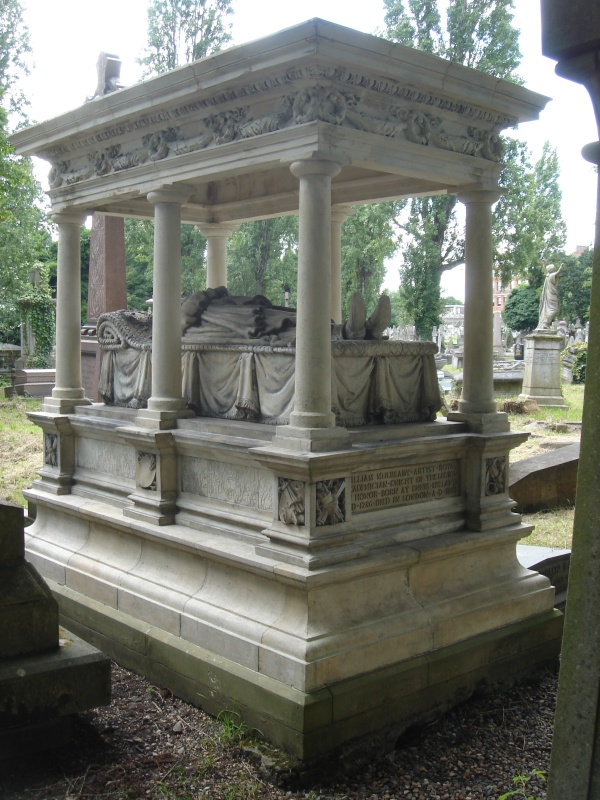
Funerary monument, Kensal Green Cemetery, London

He died at the age of 77 in Bayswater, London and is buried in the nearby Kensal Green Cemetery where a monument to his memory was erected. The monument lies on the north side of the main path, midway between the entrance and the main chapel, and although not in the front line of graves it is easily spotted due to its unique form. The tomb was designed by Godfrey Sykes.

== Gallery ==
An Old Cottage, St Albans, 1806

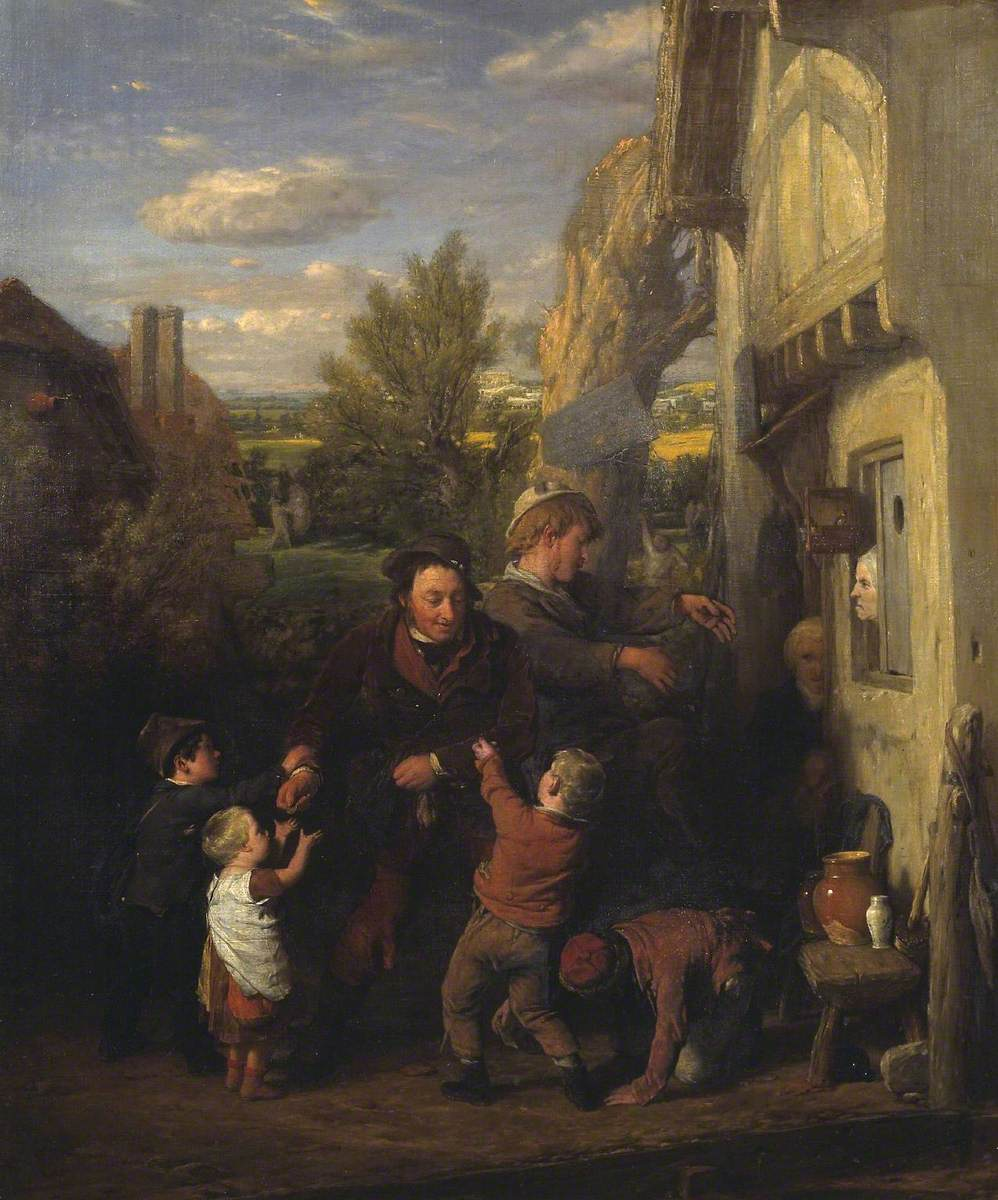
Returning from the Ale House, 1809

The Mall, Kensington Gravel Pits, 1812

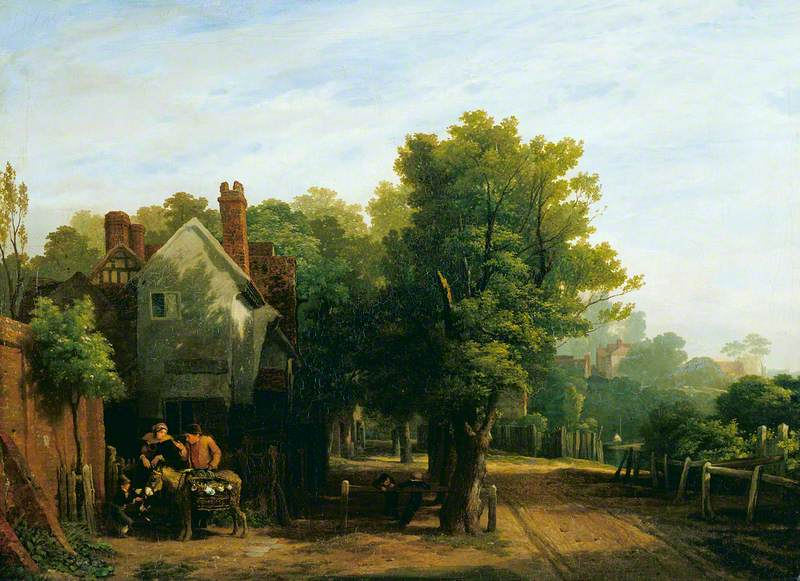
Near the Mall, Kensington Gravel Pits, 1812

Punch, 1813

The Fight Interrupted, 1816

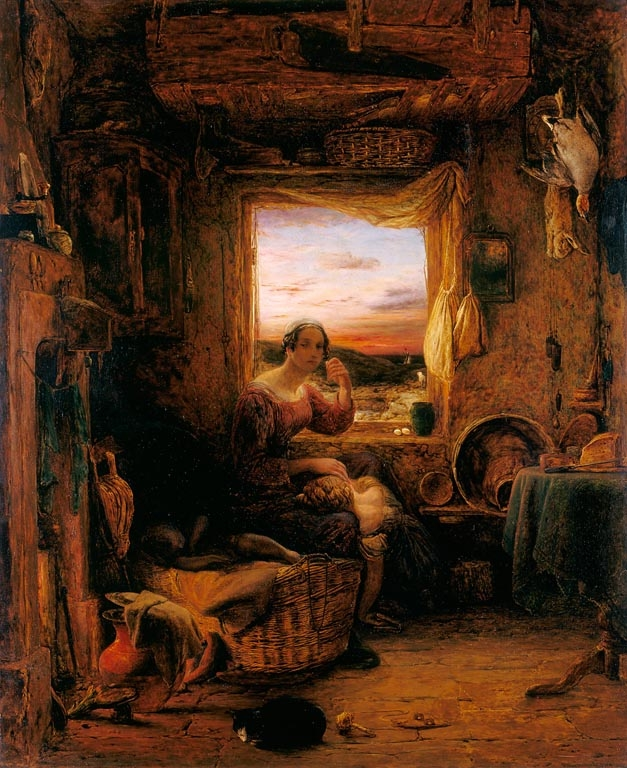
The Gamekeeper's Cottage, 1828

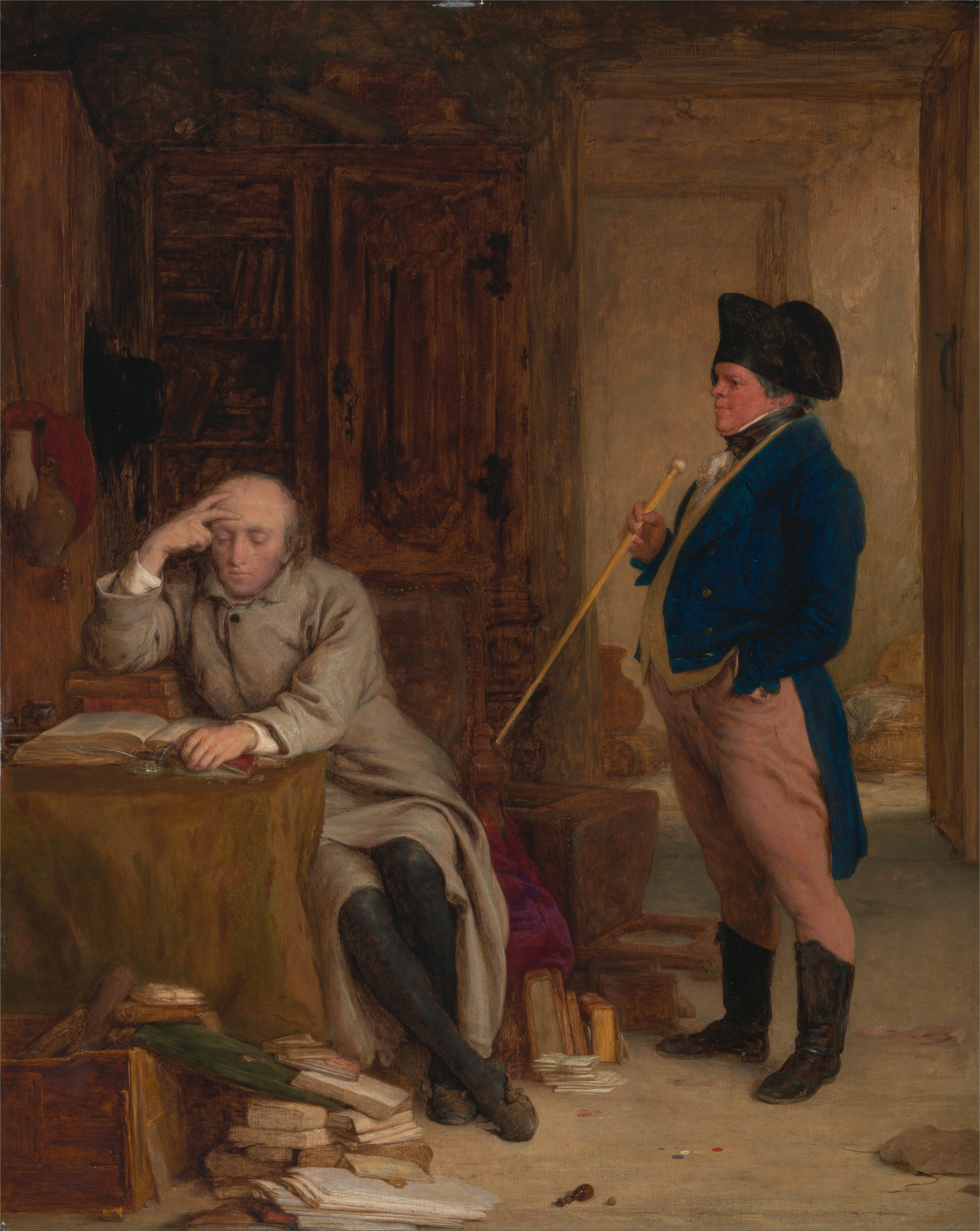
Cargill and Touchwood, 1831

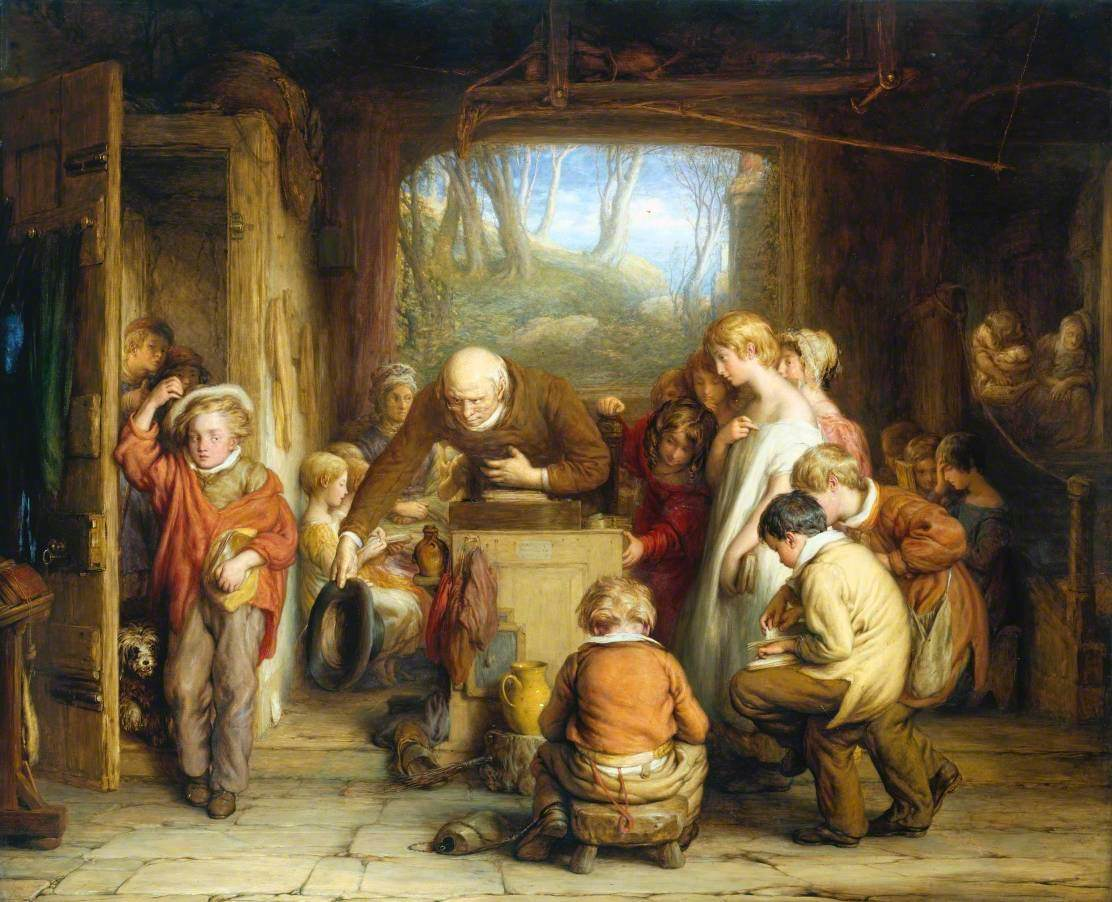
The Last In, 1835

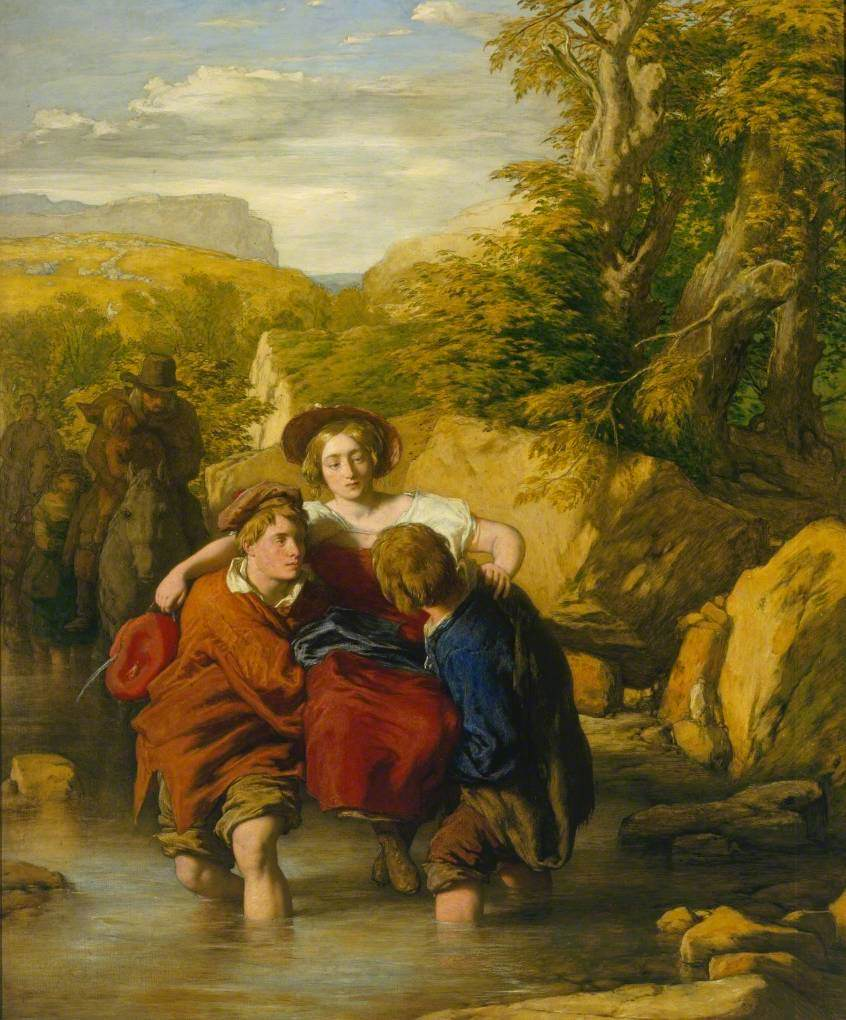
Crossing the Ford, 1842

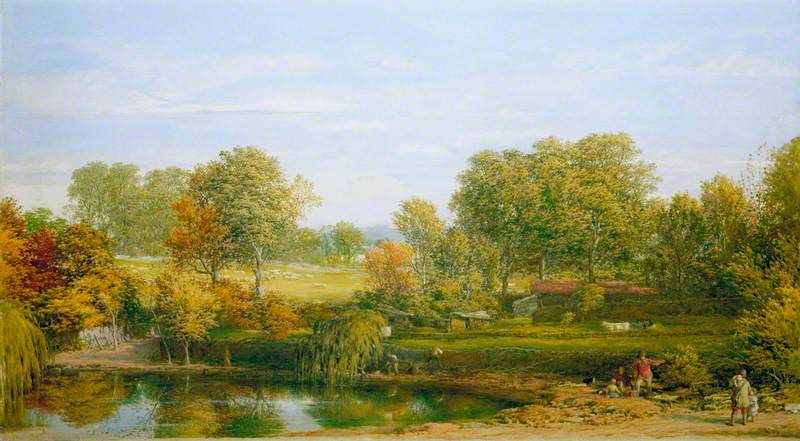
Blackheath Park, 1852

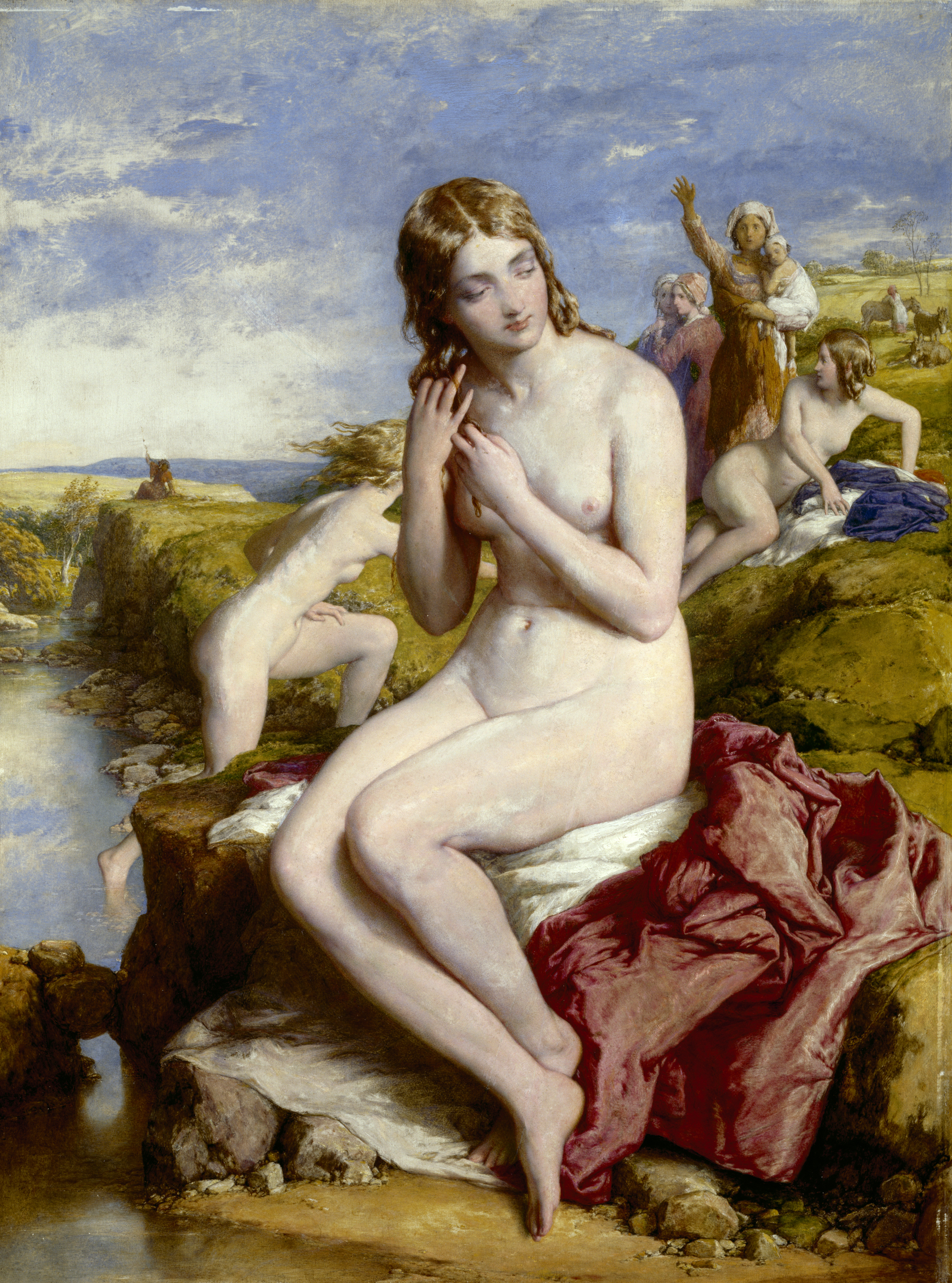
Bathers Surprised, 1853

== See also ==
- Letter sheet
- List of people on the postage stamps of Ireland
- Mulready stationery
