= Catherine Ann Dorset =

English children's writer (1752–1834)

- Born: Catherine Ann Turner; 1752; Stoke next Guildford, Surrey
- Died: 1834 (aged 81–82); Chichester
- Occupations: Writer, Poet
- Spouse: Captain Michael Dorset
- Children: Lucy Smith Dorset and Charles Ferguson Dorset
- Writing career
- Pen name: "A Lady"
- Genre: Children's books
- Notable works: The Peacock "at Home": A Sequel to the Butterfly's Ball; The Lion's Masquerade. A Sequel to the Peacock at Home; Think before You Speak: Or, the Three Wishes. A Tale

Catherine Ann Dorset (1752 – 1834) was a British author of poems for children. She had a successful career as a writer. Dorset anonymously collaborated on several works with her sister, Charlotte, which were Catherine Ann's first publications. Her better-known works were published after she took on writing as a career, following the death of her husband (Michael Dorset)..

== Personal life ==
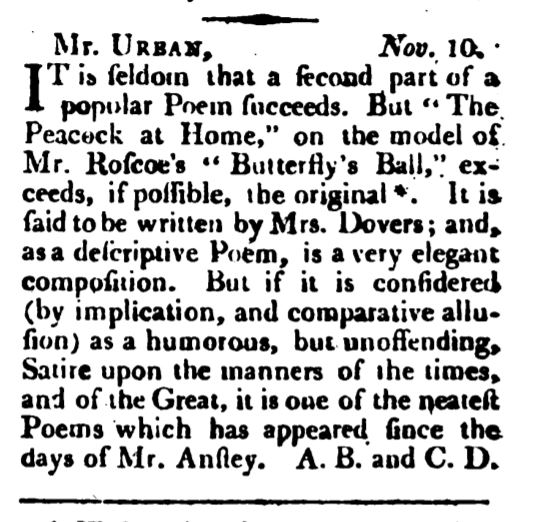
"The Gentleman's Magazine" – November 1807 – "The Peacock 'at Home'" – Praise (Urban 1807)

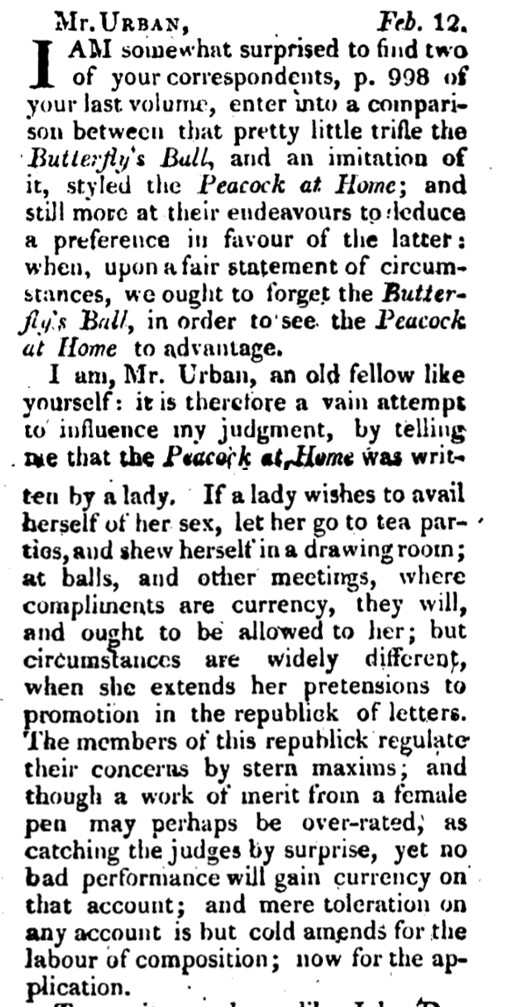
"The Gentleman's Magazine" – March 1808 – "The Peacock 'at Home'" – Criticism (Urban 1808)

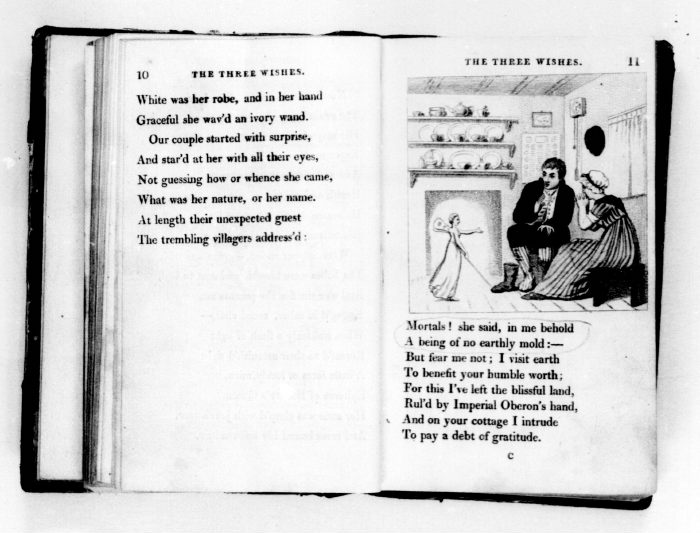
The Three wishes by Catherine Ann Dorset

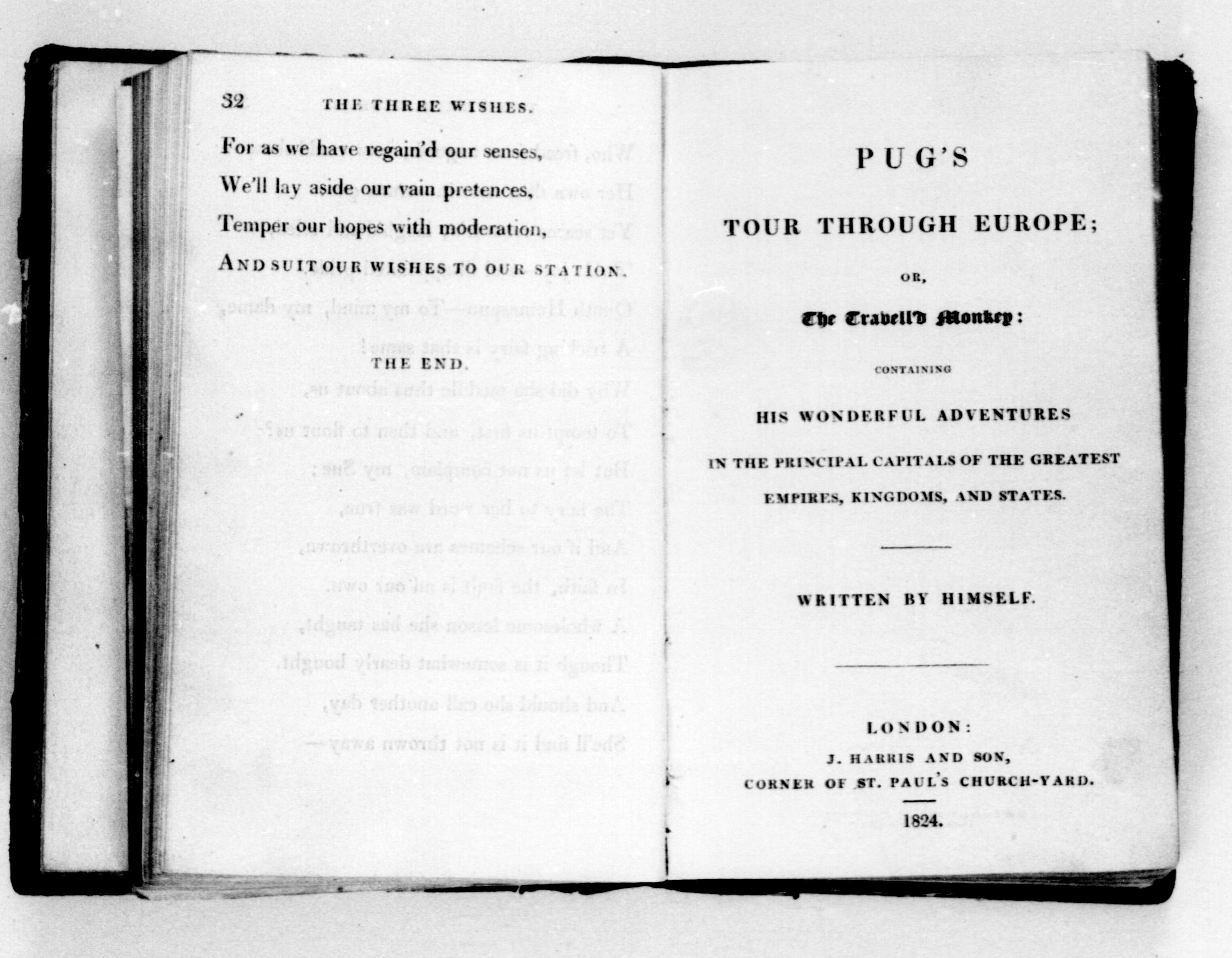
Suit our wishes to our station by Catherine Ann Dorset

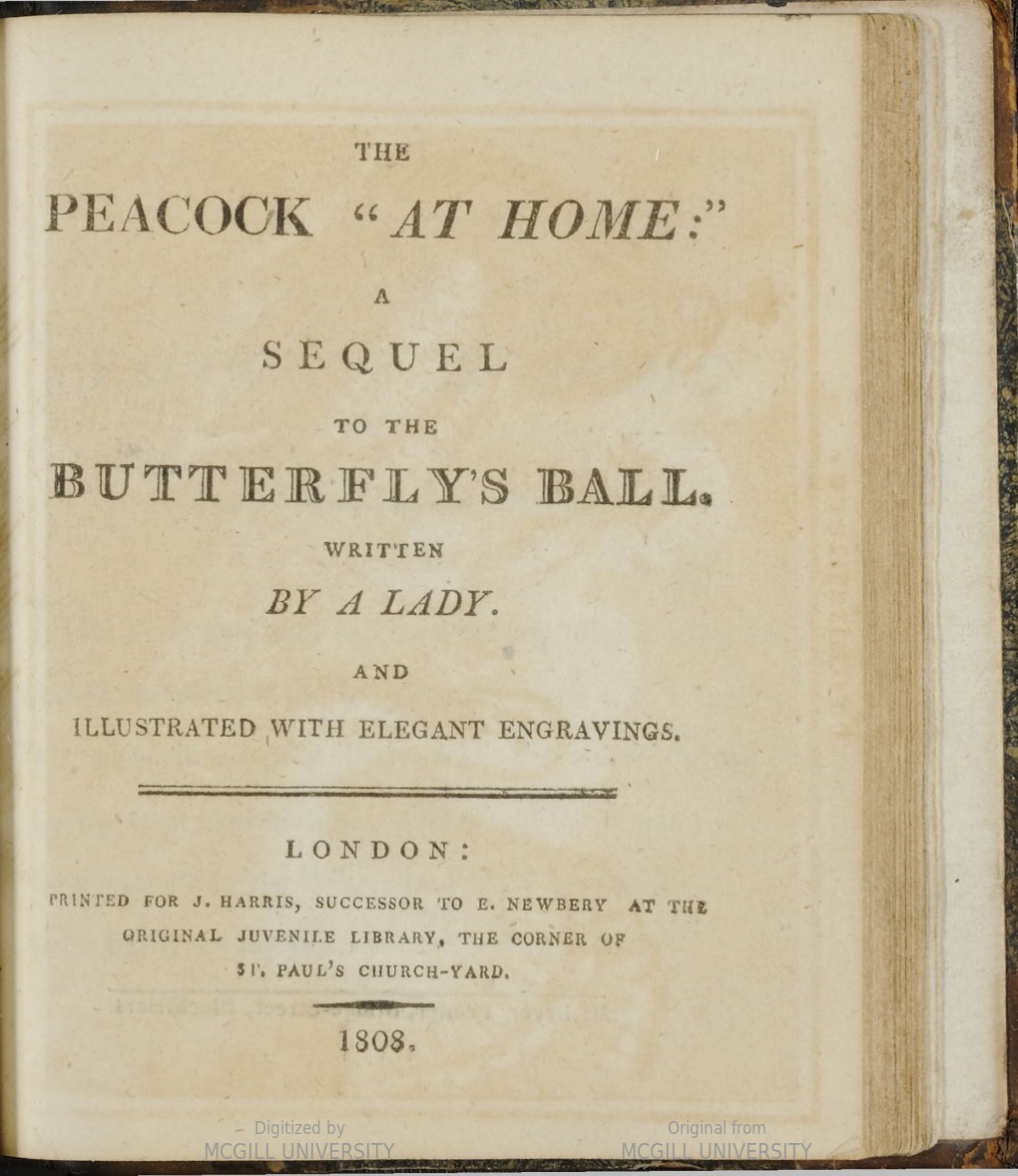
The Peacock At Home – by A Lady

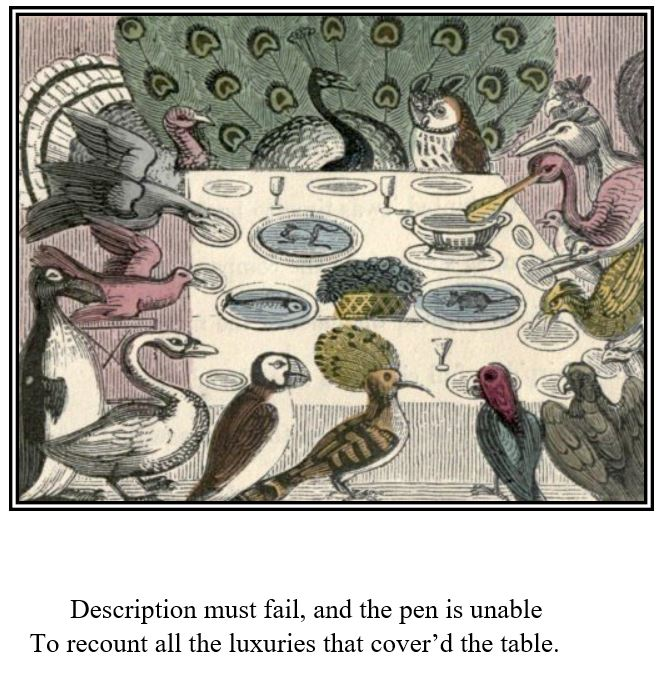
The Peacock 'at Home' by A Lady, page 5

Catherine Ann(a) Turner was born in Stoke next Guildford, Surrey in 1752 and baptized on 17 January 1753. Her parents were Nicholas Turner (landowner) and Anna née Towers (married 1748). Her mother, Anna, died in 1752, thought to be the result of Turner's own birth. Turner had two siblings, brother Nicholas, and an elder sister, Charlotte. The three children were raised by maternal maiden aunt Lucy (Towers) following their mother's death, as their father left and travelled abroad for approximately the first five years of Catherine Ann's life.

Their father remarried in 1764 to Henrietta Meriton, some years after returning from abroad. Catherine Ann married Michael Dorset between 1767 and 1771 (accounts of marriage dates vary). Michael was a captain in the army and the son of Rev. Michael Dorset. Catherine Ann and Michael had two children; a daughter, Lucy Smith Dorset (named after the maternal aunt that raised her), and a son, Charles Ferguson Dorset, who joined the army and also wrote some poetry.

When their father died, her brother inherited Bignor Park estate and Catherine was given an annuity. However, her brother failed to manage his finances and Catherine Ann was amongst his debtors. Catherine Ann took her own brother to court and her husband was awarded the estate. Catherine Ann and her sister lived there until Catherine Ann's daughter's marriage meant that the estate had to be sold. According to accounts of their lives, Catherine Ann supported both of her siblings in their times of need, however she also quarrelled with them.

Catherine Ann's sister, Charlotte, was more well known until 1807 when Catherine Ann published a story that both entertained and educated. It was titled The Peacock 'at Home': A sequel to the Butterfly's Ball. The Peacock 'at Home' gently satirized the social flaws of aristocracy and the upper-middle class, as well as teaching children about birds in an enjoyable way. The Peacock 'at Home' was originally anonymously published as "by A Lady". The poem was written in cheerful rhyming verses. The book was illustrated by the Irish painter William Mulready and was seen as a sequel to The Butterfly's Ball, and the Grasshopper's Feast by William Roscoe. The Peacock 'at Home' was a sequel to William Roscoe's book, but some felt that it was better than the original. The Peacock 'at Home' sold 40,000 copies as part of John Harris's Cabinet series. There were discussions about her poems in The Gentleman's Magazine: some applauded the piece, saying it was refreshing to see a sequel that actually surpassed the book that preceded it; others made comments on the fact that it was published by a woman and if she was looking for recognition, she should go to a tea party. Nonetheless, the series was extended and Catherine Ann contributed Think before you Speak, or, The Three Wishes and maybe another title too. Think before you Speak, or, The Three Wishes was based on a translation of a traditional French poem.

Catherine Ann also wrote an account of the life of her sister that was included in Walter Scott's Miscellaneous Prose Works in 1827. Sources say that she spent her old age in Brighton and died in Chichester around 1834–1835.

== Publications ==
=== Major works ===
- The Peacock "At Home": A Sequel to the Butterfly's Ball (London 1807) (The Peacock At Home - by A Lady teaches children in an enjoyable way about birds)
- The Lion's Masquerade. A Sequel to the Peacock at Home (London 1807)
- The Lioness's Rout; being a Sequel to the Butterfly's Ball, the Grasshopper's Feast, and The Peacock 'at Home' (London 1808)
- Think before You Speak: Or, the Three Wishes. A Tale (London 1809)
- The Peacock At Home; and Other Poems (London 1809)
- The Peacock Abroad; or Visits Returned (Greenwich 1812)
- The Peacock, and Parrot, on their Tour to Discover the Author of "The Peacock at Home" (London 1816)

=== Other publications ===
She first appeared in print when her sister anonymously inserted at least eleven poems of Catherine Ann's into her own Conversations Introducing Poetry: Chiefly on Subjects of Natural History. For the Use of Children and Young Persons (1804)

The poems include:

- The Mimosa
- To the Lady-Bird
- The Humble Bee
- The Door-mouse Just Taken
- The Squirrel
- The Hot-House Rose
- The Glow-Worm
- The Captive Fly
- The Nautilus
- The Humming Bird
- The Blighted Rose retitled The Cankered Rose

All of these were reprinted by Catherine Ann Dorset under her own name in The Peacock "At Home"; and Other Poems (London, 1809)

== Family Tree ==
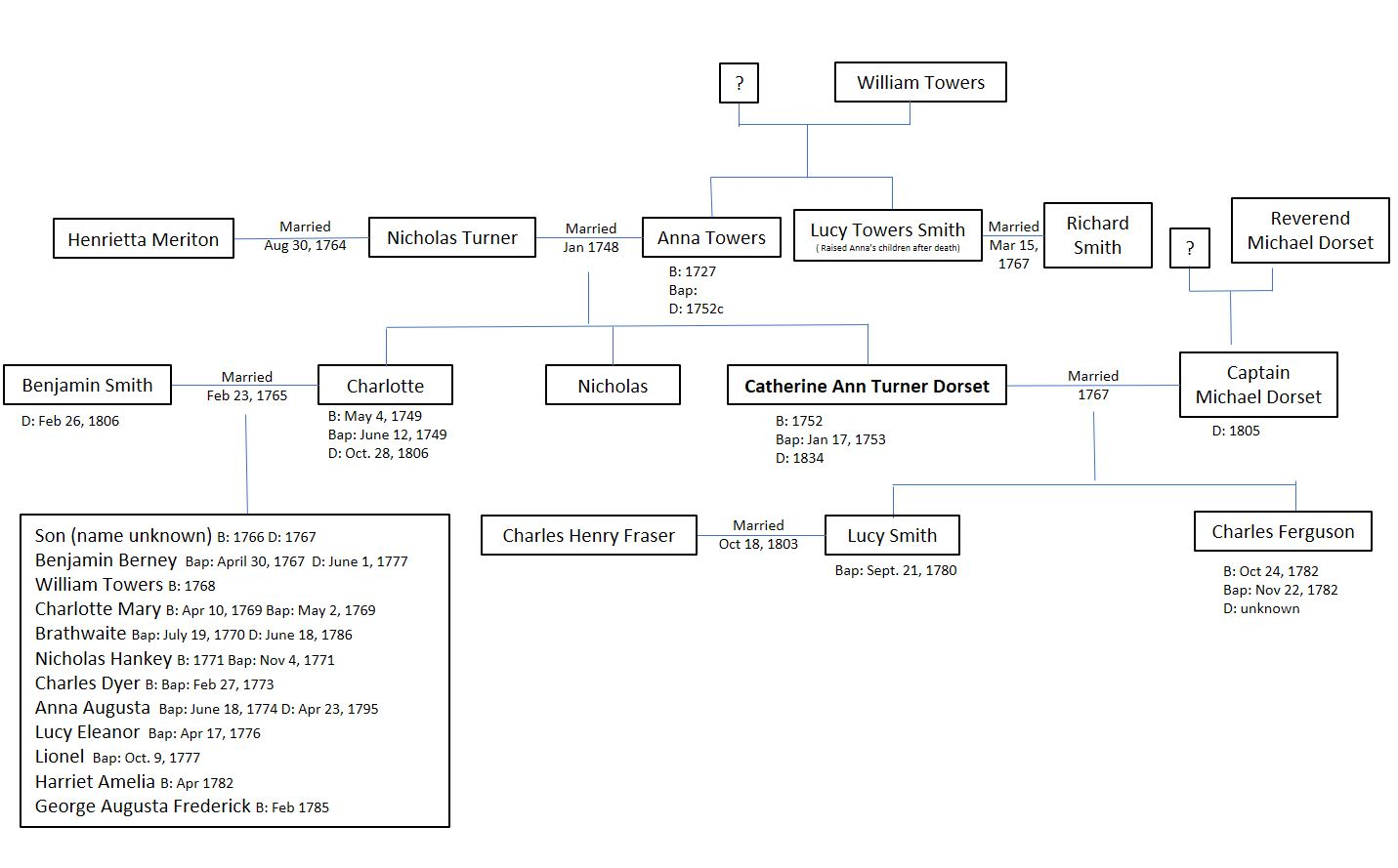
Catherine Ann Dorset Family Tree

== Sources ==
1. A Lady (1815). The Peacock 'at Home' (27th ed.) – via Project Gutenberg.
2. A Lady (1808). The Peacock 'at Home' – via HathiTrust Digital Library.
3. Darton, Frederick Joseph Harvey (1932) [2011]. Alderson, Brian (ed.). Children's Books in England : Five Centuries of Social Life (5th ed.). CUP. ISBN 978-1108033817.
4. Dorset, Catherine; Scott, Walter (1827). "Charlotte Smith". Miscellaneous Prose Works. Vol. IV Biographical Memoirs. Cadell. pp. 3–47.
5. Feldman, Paula R, ed. (1997). British Women Poets of the Romantic Era : an Anthology. JHUP. ISBN 978-0801854309.
6. Stanton, Judith Phillips, ed. (2003). The Collected Letters of Charlotte Smith (PDF). Indiana UP. Archived from the original (PDF) on 23 Nov 2020.
7. Smith, Charlotte (1804a). Conversations Introducing Poetry: chiefly on subjects of Natural Science. For the use of Children and Young Persons (PDF). Vol. I. Johnson, St Paul's Churchyard, London. Stanford 195269.
  Smith, Charlotte (1804b). Conversations Introducing Poetry: chiefly on subjects of Natural Science. For the use of Children and Young Persons (PDF). Vol. II. Johnson, St Paul's Churchyard, London. Stanford 195269.
8. Turner, Katherine (2006). Dorset [née Turner], Catherine Ann (2nd revised ed.). OUP. doi:10.1093/ref:odnb/7845. (Subscription, Wikipedia Library access or UK public library membership required.)
9. Urban, Sylvanus (1807). "The Gentleman's Magazine". 77 (Pt.2): 846–847, 998 – via HathiTrust Digital Library.
10. Urban, Sylvanus (1808). "The Gentleman's Magazine". 78 (Pt.1): 206–207 – via HathiTrust Digital Library.
