= Stoke Park, Guildford =

Park in South East England

Coordinates: 51°14′45″N 0°33′48″W

Stoke Park
- Stoke Park and Gardens
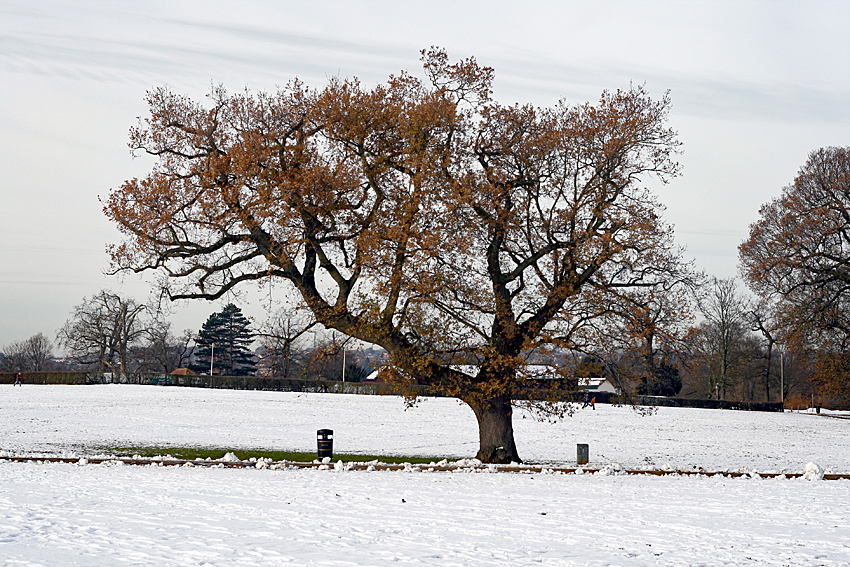
- Stoke Park in winter

- Location within Surrey
- Location: Guildford, Surrey
- Area: 52 hectares (130 acres)
- Created: 1925
- Owner: Guildford Borough Council
- Administrator: Parks and Countryside Service
- Awards: Green Flag award
- Public transit: London Road (Guildford) railway station

Stoke Park is a 52-hectare (130-acre) park on the north-eastern edge of the town centre of Guildford, Surrey, England. The land was purchased by the Guildford Corporation in 1925, with the express wish that it "remain for all time a lung of the town".

Between London Road and Parkway, two of the four arterial roads to the A3, Stoke Park is the largest park within the town signed area of Guildford. It is also a Green Flag award-winning park. The park and its woodland have remained more or less intact since they were laid out in the 18th century. Then, there was the manor house which owned slightly more land remaining from the manor of Stoke-next-Guildford, complete with walled garden and icehouse.

Guildford Lido, an open-air swimming pool in the north-western corner of the park, opened on 21 June 1933. The Jubilee Gardens, named for the Silver Jubilee of George V, were opened on 6 May 1935.

== Geography ==
To the west of the park is Guildford College. The other side of the college, away from the park, is the Grade II* listed church of St John the Evangelist. To the south of the park is Guildford Community Church, Guildford High School and London Road (Guildford) railway station. The southern edge of the park is defined by Nightingale Road and the London Road. The latter meets the A25 road, which runs along the north side of the park, in the northeast corner close to the Guildfordian Bisons RFC pitches. To the north of the A25 is the Guildford Spectrum sports centre with which the park shares its facilities. The western boundary is marked by Stoke Road. Two small patches of woodland in the middle of the park are Peacock Wood and Jubilee Wood.

== History ==
Stoke was originally a parish south of the River Wey. In 1894, it became part of Guildford, when the parish of Stoke was split into two, Stoke-within-Guildford and Stoke next Guildford. Before 1762, the site of Stoke Park was called the Paddocks, it was owned by a Mr Dyson who laid out its dimensions. In 1780, it was purchased by a Mr Aldesey. He bought it along with Stoke Mills. The road that later became the A320 Stoke Road/Woking Road was diverted in 1780 to the west end of St. John's Church in Stoke away from Stoke Park. It runs north to south, to the west of the ornamental gardens and the model boating lake in the park.

William Onslow, 4th Earl of Onslow, offered around 250 acres (100 ha) of land, including the future Stoke Park and two farms for sale at auction in 1879. Around 100 acres, including the mansion, was purchased by Samuel Smith Budgett of Monument Yard, London. Budgett died in February 1906, and after the death of his widow in November 1911, the property passed to his son, Richard Samuel Budgett. During the First World War, Stoke Lodge was used as a convalescent home for children from London.

Richard Budgett died in October 1919 and Stoke Park was inherited by his son, Hubert Maitland Budgett. The property was offered for sale at auction the following year, but failed to attract bids above its reserve price. Budgett acquired Burchatts Farm and the associated cottages in the second half of 1921. Stoke Park was acquired by the Guildford Corporation in December 1925, with the purchase funded by a bank loan of £44,565 (equivalent to £2.34 million in 2025).

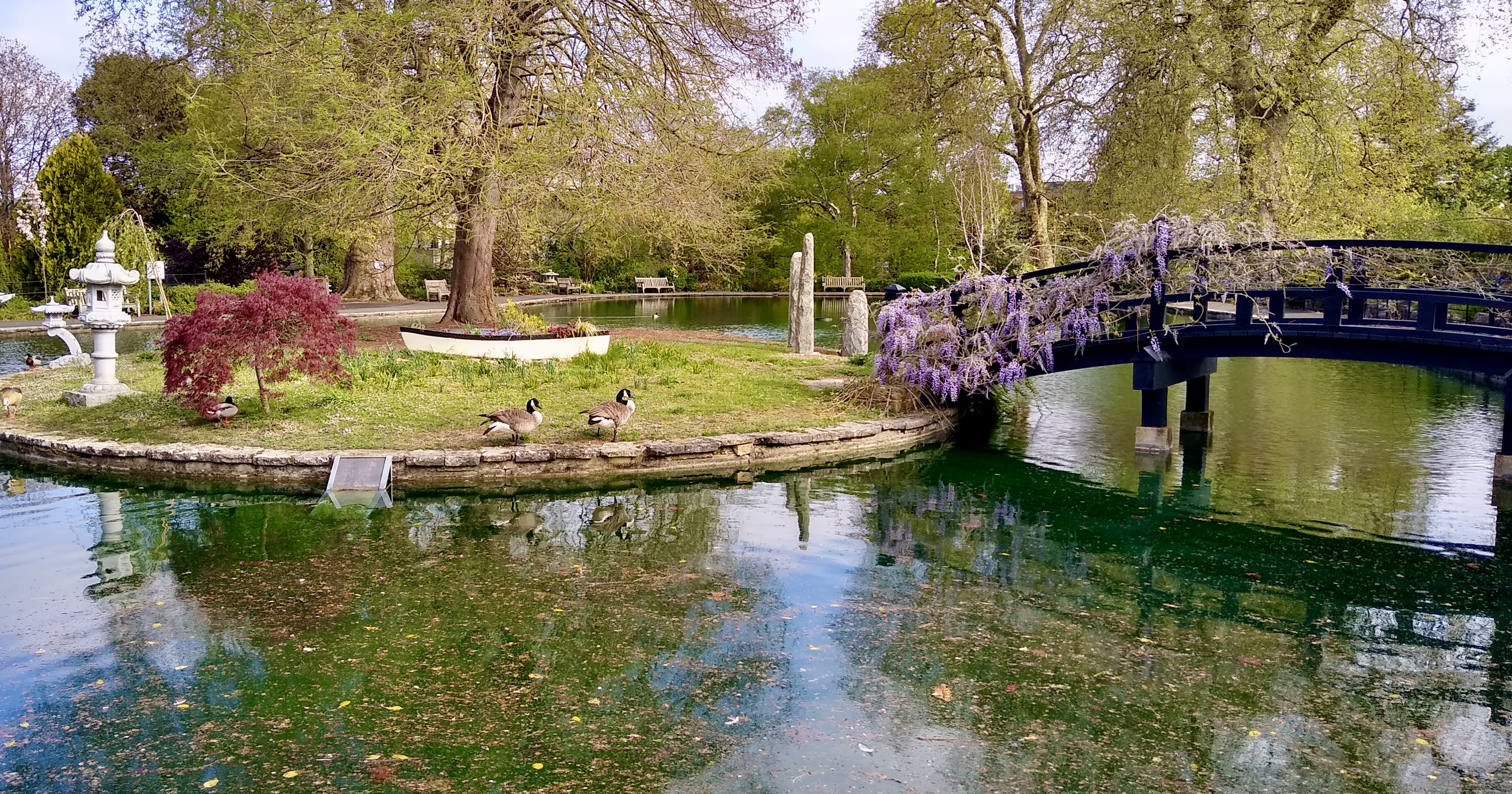
Ornamental pond, Jubilee Gardens

Guildford Lido opened on 21 June 1933 in the north-western corner of the park. Construction of the open-air pool was partly financed by The Mayor's Work Fund, established by William Harvey, the Mayor of Guildford, to provide employment for local unskilled and semi-skilled unemployed labourers during the Great Depression. The Jubilee Gardens, opened on 6 May 1935, were created in honour of the Silver Jubilee of George V. They include rock gardens, a paddling pool and a yachting pool for model boats.

Stoke Park was given a Green Flag award in mid-2024.

== Sport ==
It was home for many years to the Old Guilfordians RFC before their merger with Guildford and Godalming RFC to form Guildford Rugby Club in 2003. Following this, the junior rugby section of the club stayed at Stoke Park under the name of Guildfordians Rugby. They were joined in 2002, by disaffected Old Guildfordians, who had gone to Guildford and Godalming, thus forming Stoke Park Bisons RFC. At the beginning of the 2008–09 Season the RFU allowed the club to be named Guildfordian Bisons RFC, thus forming a link between both the senior and junior sides.

The Guildford Crows Aussie Rules FC train at Stoke Park during the summer.

== Facilities ==
Stoke Park contains sports pitches, tennis courts, woodland areas, formal gardens, climbing frames, a water cascade, an outdoor ‘trim trail’, crazy golf course, children's play area with slides, a paddling and model boating pool, concrete skatepark and other large expanses of grass. the Guildford Model Engineering Society has both model and miniature railway layouts at the eastern end of the park.

== Events ==
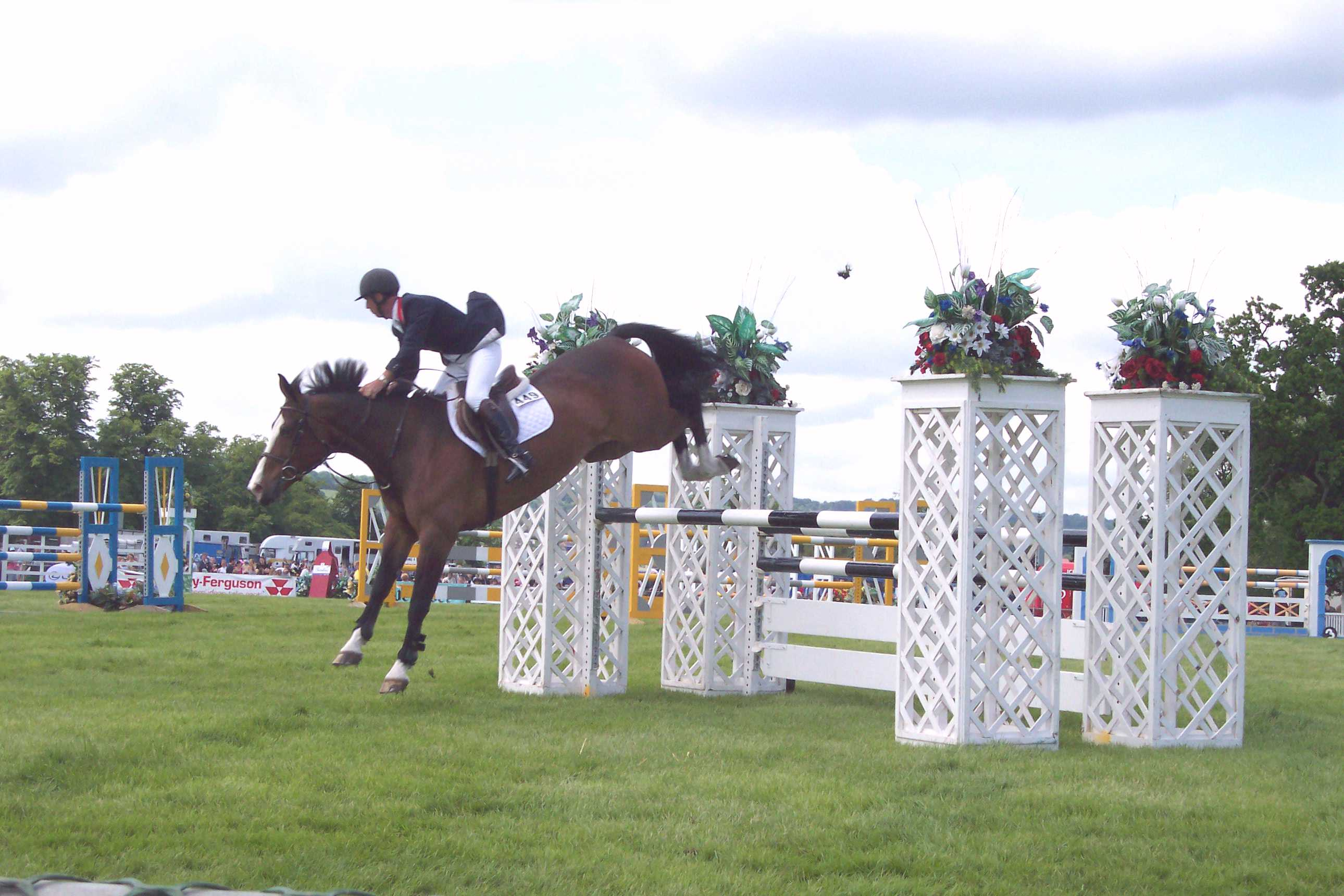
Show-jumping at the Surrey county show

Stoke Park used to be the home of the annual Surrey County Show held during the second bank holiday weekend in May. The show has not taken place since 2019 following its cancellation due to the pandemic.

Stoke Park was the site of the annual music festival GuilFest, and it holds the annual Guildford Lions Firework Fiesta on 5 November every year. The event includes many fairground attractions and food stands and starts with a torch lit procession from Guildford High Street and ends with a 20-minute firework finale.

A 5 km run against the clock is organised by the group Parkrun most Saturday mornings.
