= The Fight Interrupted =

Painting by William Mulready

- Artist: William Mulready
- Year: 1816
- Type: Oil on panel, genre painting
- Dimensions: 71.8 cm × 93.2 cm (28.3 in × 36.7 in)
- Location: Victoria and Albert Museum; London

The Fight Interrupted is an oil on canvas genre painting by the Irish artist William Mulready, from 1816. It is held at the Victoria and Albert Museum, in London.

== History and description ==
The work depicts a scene that takes place in a schoolyard, where a fight between two boys has been broken up by the schoolmaster, who listens to the conflicting accounts of the brawl from his students. The schoolmaster appears calm and patient, while talking with the kids and helding one of them by the ear. Mulready used his own father as the model for the teacher.

The painting was displayed at the Royal Academy Exhibition of 1816 at Somerset House in London and was one of the best received works on display. Many drew parallels between the youthful display of boxing and the recent British military success in the Napoleonic Wars culminating in the Battle of Waterloo. It consolidated Mulready's growing reputation following his election as a member of the Royal Academy.

== Provenance ==
Today the painting is part of the collection of the Victoria and Albert Museum, having been donated as part of the Sheepshanks Gift by the art collector John Sheepshanks, in 1857.

== Bibliography ==
- Roe, Sonia. Oil Paintings in Public Ownership in the Victoria and Albert Museum. Public Catalogue Foundation, 2008.
- Solkin, David H. Painting Out of the Ordinary: Modernity and the Art of Everyday Life in Early Nineteenth-century Britain. Yale University Press, 2009.
- Wright, Christopher, Gordon, Catherine May & Smith, Mary Peskett. British and Irish Paintings in Public Collections: An Index of British and Irish Oil Paintings by Artists Born Before 1870 in Public and Institutional Collections in the United Kingdom and Ireland. Yale University Press, 2006.
