= Bathers Surprised =

Painting by William Mulready

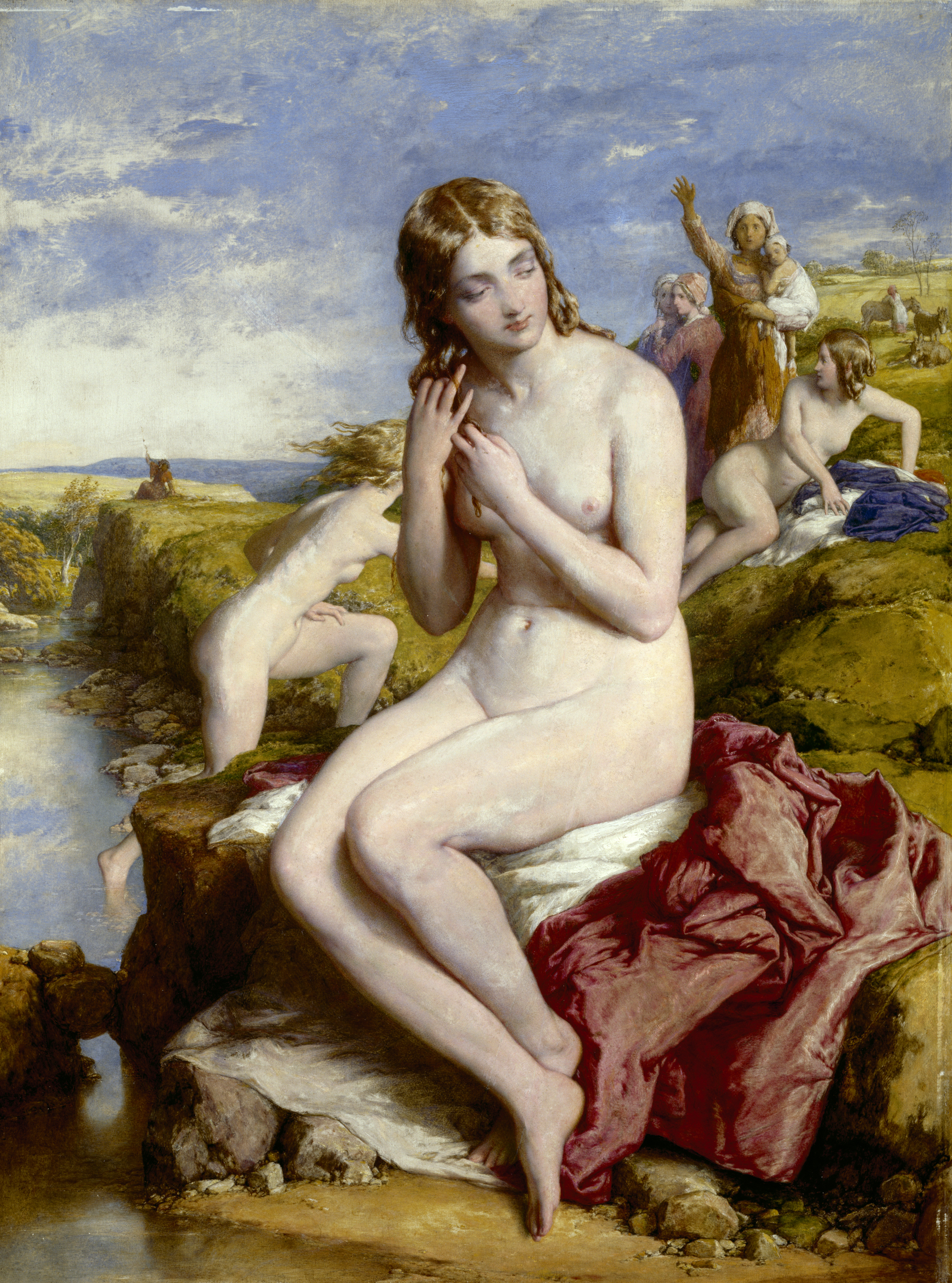
- Artist: William Mulready
- Year: 1853
- Type: Oil on panel, nude art
- Dimensions: 59 cm × 44 cm (23 in × 17 in)
- Location: National Gallery of Ireland, Dublin

Bathers Surprised is an oil painting on panel by the Irish artist William Mulready, from 1853. It is held at the National Gallery of Ireland, in Dublin.

== History and description ==
It depicts a group of naked young women surprised while bathing in a stream. A woman holding a child in the background warns the bathers of the approaching presence of a man. Two women behind her are fully clothed but also seem to share her concern. At the background left some donkeys are visible. While two of the bathers react swiftly, leaving the water to reach for their clothes, the one in the foreground remains indifferent. She was inspired by the Italian Old Master's Titian's Venus Anadyomene.

Mulready had earned his reputation during the Regency era for genre paintings depicting scenes of everyday life. This painting was exhibited at the Salon of 1855 in Paris, the Art Treasures Exhibition of 1857 in Manchester and the International Exhibition of 1862 in London. Today the work is in the collection of the National Gallery of Ireland, in Dublin, having been acquired in 1911.

== Bibliography ==
- Smith, Alison. The Victorian Nude: Sexuality, Morality and Art. Manchester University Press, 1996.
- Wright, Christopher, Gordon, Catherine May & Smith, Mary Peskett. British and Irish Paintings in Public Collections: An Index of British and Irish Oil Paintings by Artists Born Before 1870 in Public and Institutional Collections in the United Kingdom and Ireland. Yale University Press, 2006.
