= Guildford Lido =

Open-air swimming pool in Surrey, England

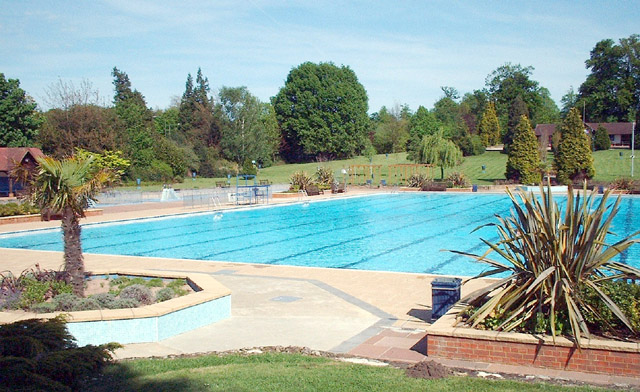
- Summer 2003
- Interactive map of Guildford Lido
- Location: Stoke Road, Guildford, Surrey, GU1 1HB
- Coordinates: 51.2473°N 0.5698°W
- Owner: Guildford Borough Council
- Operator: Freedom Leisure
- Dimensions: Length: 50 m (160 ft); Width: 27.4 m (90 ft)

Construction
- Opened: 1933
- Architect: J.W. Hipwood

Website
- Official website

Guildford Lido is a public, open-air swimming pool in Guildford, Surrey, England. In Stoke Park, to the north of the town centre, it is surrounded by 1.8 ha (4.5 acres) of landscaped grounds. The lido attracts around 90,000 visits each year. It is owned by Guildford Borough Council and has been run by Freedom Leisure since 2011.

The lido was built during the Great Depression and opened in June 1933. Its construction was part-financed by "The Mayor's Work Fund", devised by the then Mayor of Guildford, William Harvey, to provide paid work opportunities for unemployed residents of the town.

The pool was originally constructed under the imperial system of measurements to dimensions of 165 ft (50.3 m) by 90 ft (27.4 m), but during refurbishment work in 1989, the length was reduced by around 30 cm to 50 m (160 ft) to allow it to meet international competition standards.

== Description ==
The main pool measures 50 m (160 ft) long by 27.4 m (90 ft) wide. Like Hilsea Lido and Stratford Park lido, the deepest point is in the centre, meaning that there are two "shallow ends". In the summer months, the water is heated to around 24 °C. At weekends during the winter season (September to April), the temperature is set to 10 °C. There is level access to the poolside and there are facilities for disabled swimmers, including dedicated changing rooms and a hoist.

In 2007, The Independent reported that the lido was attracting c. 90,000 visits each year. The pool is owned by Guildford Borough Council, although the operation and management of the facility have been outsourced to Freedom Leisure since 2011.

== History ==
William Harvey served two consecutive, one-year terms as Mayor of Guildford during the Great Depression. By the end of October 1932, the number of unemployed men in the town had reached 657. (Note: Local historian, E. R. Chamberin notes that the number of unskilled and semi-skilled unemployed labourers in Guildford would have been considerably higher in 1932, were it not for the construction of the bypass (now the A3), which began in 1929. Under the funding agreement with the UK government, half of those involved in building the new road were to be recruited from Wales and the north and west of England, but the remainder could be drawn from the local area.)

On 9 November, he launched an initiative that he called "The Mayor's Work Fund", to employ those without jobs on projects controlled by the borough council. The hourly wage was to be set at one shilling and, to ensure that the maximum number of workers could benefit, the working week was limited to 35 hours. (Note: Men with more than four children were permitted to work more than 35 hours per week.) By the time the fund closed at the end of March 1933, it had received contributions of £10,720, of which £3000 had been given by the council and the rest donated by members of the public. A total of 150,000 hours of paid work was undertaken by 590 men over the four months that the scheme was operational. (Note: Chamberin recognises the importance of the personal commitment of William Harvey to the success of The Mayor's Work Fund: "…long before he took it to the public, he had worked out every detail and, once it was launched, he devoted the greater part of his waking hours both to its encouragement and its administration.")

Stoke Park had been acquired by the council for £42,500 in 1925, but no work to develop it as an amenity for the town had been undertaken. An open-air swimming pool at the west end of the park was first proposed in 1930, but scheme was not pursued owing to the economic climate. The site was flat, meaning that extensive ground works were not required.

Construction of the lido was authorised by the borough council on 20 December 1932 and work began on the site the following day. The £14,000 cost was shared equally between the borough council and The Mayor's Work Fund. By early January 1933, 90 men were involved in building the new pool, a number that increased to 120, when floodlighting was installed and a double shift system began operating. After the fund had been wound up at the end of March 1933, 100 men were retained to complete the work on the lido, which was finished by mid-April of the same year.

Harvey opened the lido on 21 June 1933 at a ceremony, attended by 6000 members of the public. In his speech, he described the pool as "Guildford's garden of glad sacrifice" and praised local residents for their contribution to The Mayor's Work Fund. "Guildford has done it" he added, before removing his mayoral robe, underneath which he was wearing a bathing costume, and diving into the water. In its first week of opening, the lido attracted almost 8,000 visitors and, by November of that year, it had made an operating profit of £3,600.

An article published in the Municipal Engineering, Sanitary Record and Municipal Motor in July 1933 noted that the lido had been designed by J.W. Hipwood, the Borough Engineer and Surveyor. The main pool tank had a capacity of 2,300,000 L (500,000 imp gal) and the water filtration system was capable of processing 2,160,000 L (475,000 imp gal) every six hours. On the south side of the pool, 132 dressing cubicles had been built and 600 clothes lockers provided for bathers. The main diving platform had a height of 4.95 m (16 ft 3 in) above the water and there were two additional diving boards set at 3 m (9 ft 9 in) and 1 m (3 ft 3 in) above the surface.

The scheme attracted attention both nationally and internationally. Harvey was invited to speak about the work fund at Haywards Heath, Newbury and Horsham. In March 1933, he chaired a "Work for Wages" conference in London. The opening ceremony for the lido was reported in The Herald (Melbourne), the Havana Post and the Cape Times. In the New Year Honours list of 1934, Harvey was awarded an O.B.E. "for services in relief of unemployment" and was made an Honorary Freeman of the Borough of Guildford on 27 March of the same year.

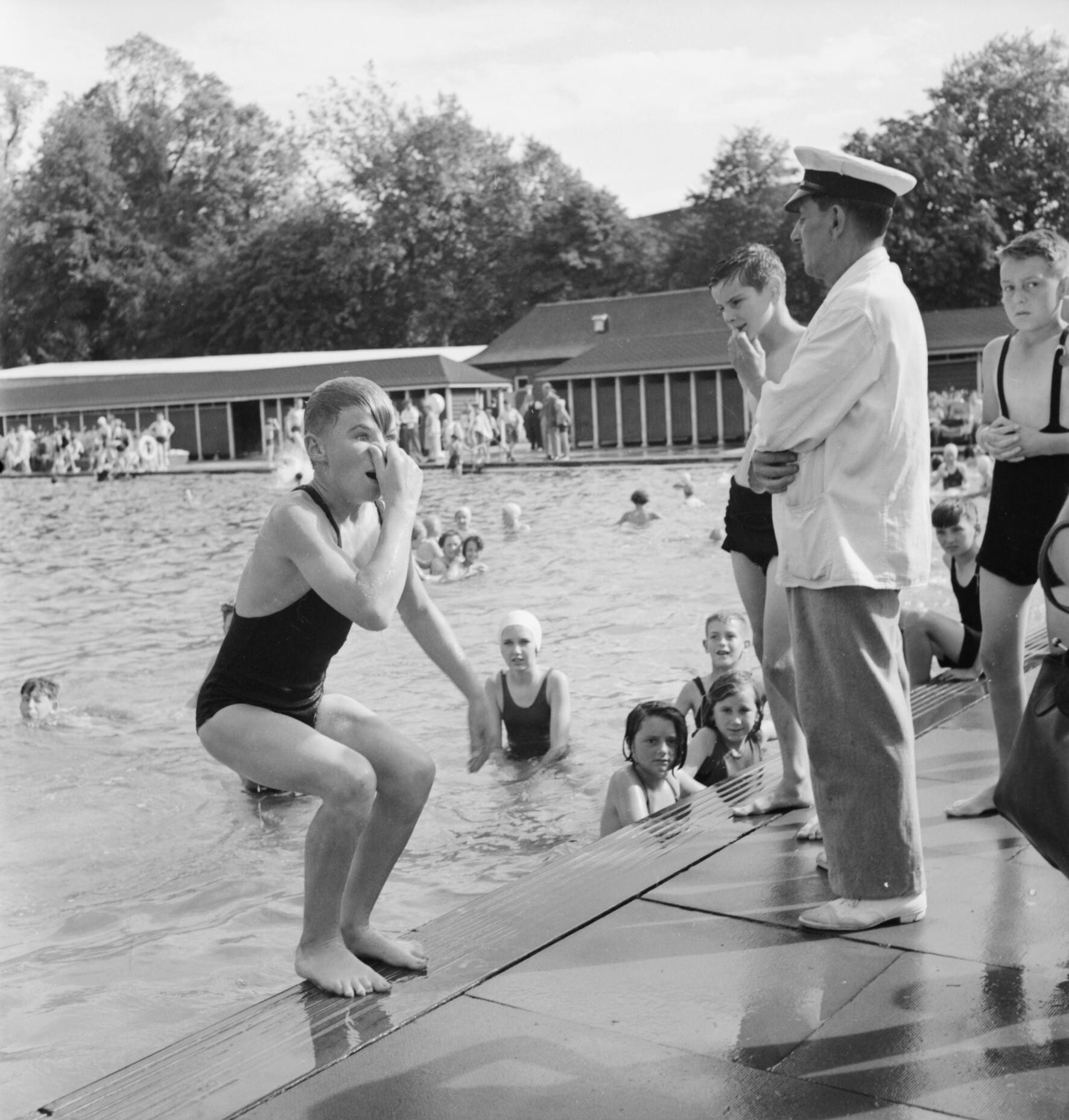
The lido in 1943

Guildford Lido was rebuilt in 1989. During the works, the length was shortened by 30 cm to 50 m (160 ft) to allow it to meet international competition standards. The pool was relined in 2002. New water slides were installed in 2013, in a £0.5M project funded by Guildford Borough Council. The lido did not open in 2020, owing to the COVID-19 pandemic. The pool closed on 1 October 2023 for essential works to repair a leak.

== Accidents and incidents ==
On 24 July 1958, Trevor Griffiths, a 13-year-old schoolboy from Puttenham, drowned at the lido, while using a defective snorkel. On 6 August 1964, Tony Bishop, an 18-year-old building worker from Farncombe, died after losing consciousness in the pool. At the inquest into his death, a doctor from the Royal Surrey County Hospital said that a piece of chewing gum had been found in his throat, which might have caused him to choke under water.

== Bibliography ==
- Chamberlin, E.R. (1982). Guildford (2nd ed.). Chichester: Phillimore. ISBN 978-0-85-033457-9.
- Hutchinson, Philip (2009). Guildford past and present. Stroud: History Press. ISBN 978-0-75-245127-5.
- Smith, Janet (2006). Liquid assets: the lidos and open air swimming pools of Britain. English Heritage. ISBN 978-0-95-474450-2.
- Pusill, Emma; Wilkinson, Janet (2019). The lido guide. London: Unbound. ISBN 978-1-78-352742-7.
