= William Trodd =

English cricketer

William Trodd (7 August 1836 – 9 April 1880) was an English first-class cricketer active 1869 who played for Surrey. He was born in Guildford; died in Bow, London. His brother, John, was also a first-class cricketer.
