= Ents24 =

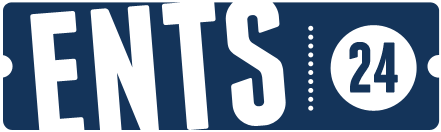
- Company type: Limited company
- Founded: 2000
- Headquarters: Bristol, United Kingdom
- Products: Entertainment listings and information
- Number of employees: 24
- Website: www.ents24.com

Ents24 is a live entertainment website that provides listings, information, and directs visitors to tickets for events encompassing live music, clubbing, cinema, theatre, arts, days out and stand-up comedy. The site contains details of around 100,000 events happening across the UK at any given time, and is visited by around 2 million people every month, making it the UK's busiest ticketing site after Ticketmaster.

In 2017, 2018 and 2019, Ents24 was nominated for Music Week's Best Ticketing Company award.

The site also allows visitors to track artists and venues, in order to be notified when a new event is added featuring that artist or venue.

== Website features ==
In addition to providing information about events, the site also allows users to buy tickets in association with many of the UK's best-known online ticket sellers Ticketmaster, See Tickets, Ticketweb, Wegottickets and others, as well as linking to smaller independent retailers.

Ents24 listings can be filtered by genre, location, time frame, level of disabled access, as well as displaying only free events, events with special offer tickets, events from the visitor's tracked artists and other time-sensitive filters (e.g. Artists playing at this year's Brit Awards).

While Ents24 do allow end-users to add events to their database, unlike other events websites, they check all submitted listings manually and often add photographs and additional copy. Listings can be added to the events guide for free.

Ents24 operate a number of email-based services, including a weekly newsletter and 'tour date alerts' which are sent to users when tour dates from one of their selected artists are added to the website. Around two million alerts are sent out each month.

== Backstage ==
In September 2015, Ents24 relaunched their Backstage platform for event organisers, enabling users to list their events, have them promoted to Ents24's large audience and to sell tickets directly, via a partnership with See Tickets.

== GigAlert ==
In October 2015, Ents24 launched the GigAlert app for iPhone 4S and above, allowing users to access its full event listings wherever they are, with or without a data connection, with or without logging in. It also allowed users to receive instant notifications when artists they have chosen to track announce a new show, and receive reminders just before tickets go on sale.

== Event Affinity Engine ==
In late 2017, Ents24 developed its Event Affinity Engine, an innovation that uses data connections to predict events that each individual is most likely to enjoy. The Engine formed the basis for two new tools; Smart Gift Finder, which predicts events, and Find Your Festival, which predicts festivals and rearranges the line-up to match an individual's tastes. The Event Affinity Engine was the sole UK nominee for the Insights & Analytics Award at the 2018 Ticketing Business Awards.

== History ==
The domain name ents24.com was registered in October 1999, and Ents24 was registered as a Limited Company in 2000.

== See also ==
Other websites offering similar services to Ents24 are:

- Bandsintown
- Songkick
