= John Trodd =

English cricketer

Personal information
- Full name: William Trodd
- Born: 7 August 1836; Stoke next Guildford, Surrey, England
- Died: 26 October 1858 (aged 30); Bromborough Pool, Cheshire, England
- Batting: Unknown
- Bowling: Unknown
- Relatives: William Trodd (brother)

Career statistics
| Competition | First-class |
|---|---|
| Matches | 1 |
| Runs scored | 4 |
| Batting average | 4.00 |
| 100s/50s | –/– |
| Top score | 4* |
| Balls bowled | 32 |
| Wickets | 0 |
| Bowling average | – |
| 5 wickets in innings | – |
| 10 wickets in match | – |
| Best bowling | – |
| Catches/stumpings | –/– |
- Source: Cricinfo, 2 October 2018

John Trodd (19 July 1828 – 26 October 1858) was an English first-class cricketer.

Trodd was born at Stoke next Guildford in July 1828. He made a single appearance in first-class cricket in 1855 for the Surrey Club against the Marylebone Cricket Club (MCC) at Lord's. He batted in both Surrey Club innings', being dismissed without scoring by James Grundy in their first-innings, while in their second-innings he was unbeaten on 4. He also bowled eight wicket-less overs in the MCC first-innings. He died at Bromborough Pool, Cheshire, in October 1858. His brother, William, was also a first-class cricketer.
